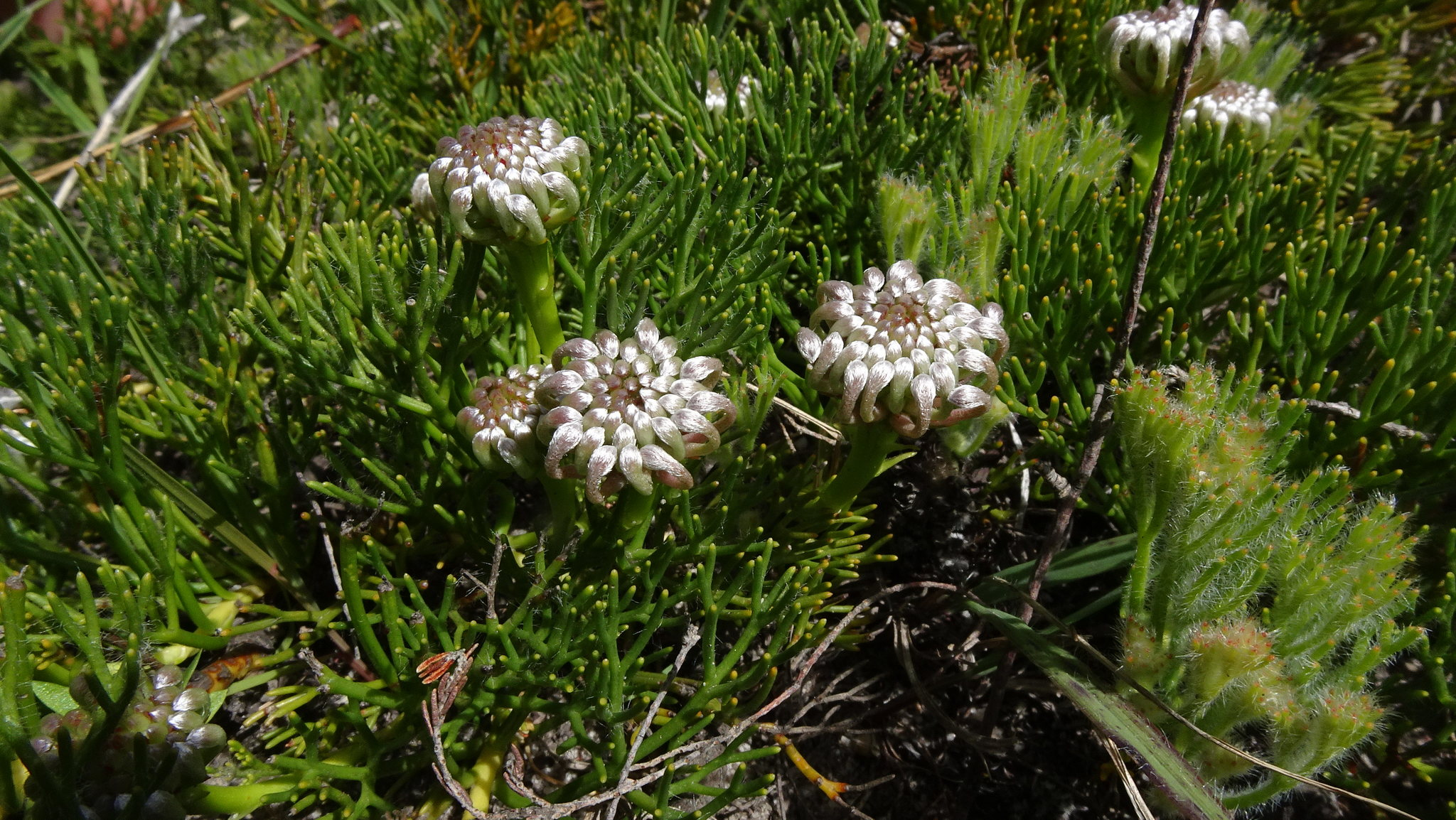

Conservation status
- Near Threatened (IUCN 3.1)

Scientific classification
- Kingdom: Plantae
- Clade: Embryophytes
- Clade: Tracheophytes
- Clade: Spermatophytes
- Clade: Angiosperms
- Clade: Eudicots
- Order: Proteales
- Family: Proteaceae
- Genus: Serruria
- Species: S. effusa

Binomial name
- Serruria effusa Rourke, (1990)
- IUCN distribution of the Candelabra spiderhead Extant (resident)

= Serruria effusa =

Shrub endemic to the Western Cape, South Africa

Serruria effusa, the candelabra spiderhead, is a flowering shrub that belongs to the genus Serruria and forms part of the fynbos. The plant is endemic to the Western Cape, where it occurs in the Olifants River Mountains and the Cederberg. The shrub is upright with a diameter of 1.5 m, one grows to 1.5 m high and bears flowers from August to September.

Fire destroys the plant but the seeds survive. Two months after flowering, the fruit falls and ants disperse the seeds. They store the seeds in their nests. The plant is bisexual. Pollination takes place through the action of insects. The plant grows at altitudes of 100–750 m.

This shrub was recorded for the first time by Schlechter in September 1894 at Alexandershoek in the Olifantsrivierberge. It has also been confused with Serruria cygnea.

== Sources ==
- REDLIST Sanbi
- Biodiversityexplorer
- Protea Atlas
- Plants of the World Online
