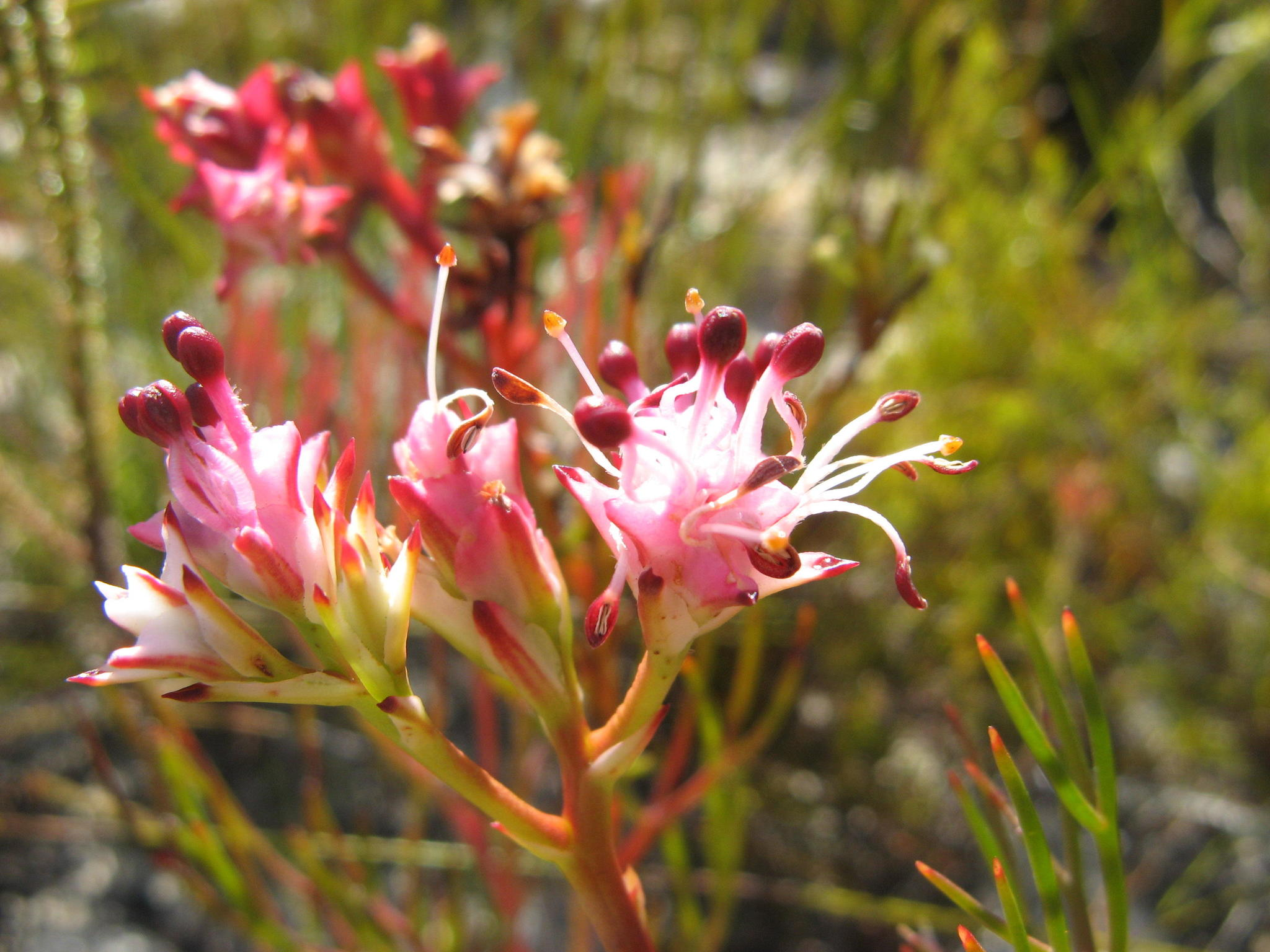

Conservation status
- Endangered (IUCN 3.1)

Scientific classification
- Kingdom: Plantae
- Clade: Tracheophytes
- Clade: Angiosperms
- Clade: Eudicots
- Order: Proteales
- Family: Proteaceae
- Genus: Serruria
- Species: S. meisneriana

Binomial name
- Serruria meisneriana Schltr.

= Serruria meisneriana =

Species of plant

Serruria meisneriana, the dainty spiderhead, is a flowering shrub that belongs to the genus Serruria and forms part of the fynbos. The plant is endemic to the Western Cape and occurs in the north-east Babylon Tower and Greenland Mountains. The shrub is slender and grows to 50 cm high and flowers from July to October

Fire destroys the plant but the seeds survive. Two months after flowering, the fruit falls and ants disperse the seeds. They store the seeds in their nests. The plant is unisexual. Pollination takes place through the action of insects. The plant grows in shale soil at altitudes of 450 – 650 m.

== Sources ==
- REDLIST Sanbi
- Biodiversityexplorer
- Protea Atlas
- Plants of the World Online
