= Serruria kraussii =

Conservation status
- Vulnerable (IUCN 3.1)

Scientific classification
- Kingdom: Plantae
- Clade: Tracheophytes
- Clade: Angiosperms
- Clade: Eudicots
- Order: Proteales
- Family: Proteaceae
- Genus: Serruria
- Species: S. kraussii

Binomial name
- Serruria kraussii Meisn.

Species of plant

Serruria kraussii, the snowball spiderhead, is a flowering shrub that belongs to the genus Serruria and forms part of the fynbos. The plant is endemic to the Western Cape and occurs in the Hottentots-Hollandberge from Jonkershoek to Helderberg. The shrub grows upright and reaches a height of 1.0 m and flowers from July to November.

The plant dies after a fire but the seeds survive. Two months after flowering, the fruit falls and ants disperse the seeds. They store the seeds in their nests. The plant is unisexual. Pollination takes place through the action of insects. The plant grows in granite and sandstone soil at elevations of 180 – 460 m.

== Sources ==
- REDLIST Sanbi
- Biodiversityexplorer
- Protea Atlas
- Plants of the World Online
