= Serruria gracilis =

Conservation status
- Vulnerable (IUCN 3.1)

Scientific classification
- Kingdom: Plantae
- Clade: Tracheophytes
- Clade: Angiosperms
- Clade: Eudicots
- Order: Proteales
- Family: Proteaceae
- Genus: Serruria
- Species: S. gracilis

Binomial name
- Serruria gracilis Salisb. ex Knight

Species of plant

Serruria gracilis, the graceful spiderhead, is a flowering shrub that belongs to the genus Serruria and forms part of the fynbos. The plant is endemic to the Western Cape, where it occurs on the Cape Flats from Durbanville to and in the Hottentots-Hollandberge and Du Toitskloofberge. The shrub is flat, grows 1.0 m high and bears flowers from July to October.

After a fire, the plant sprouts again. Two months after flowering, the fruit falls and ants disperse the seeds. They store the seeds in their nests. The plant is bisexual. Pollination takes place through the action of insects. The plant grows in sand and granite slopes at elevations of 150–310 m.

== Sources ==
- REDLIST Sanbi
- Biodiversityexplorer
- Protea Atlas
- Plants of the World Online
