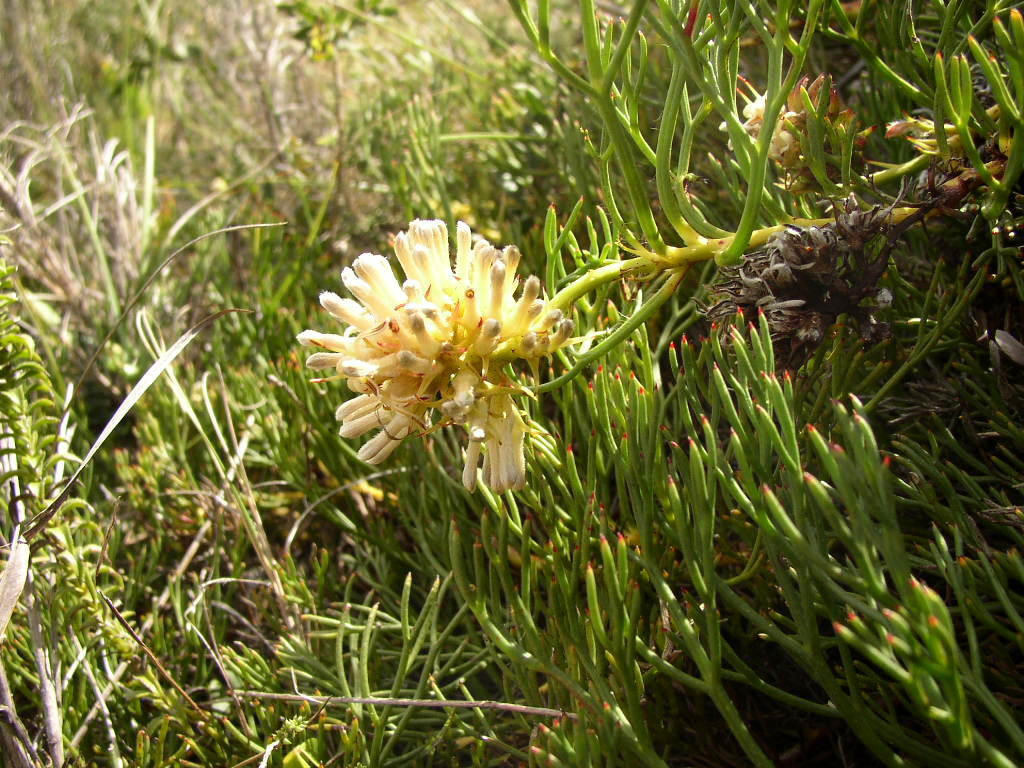

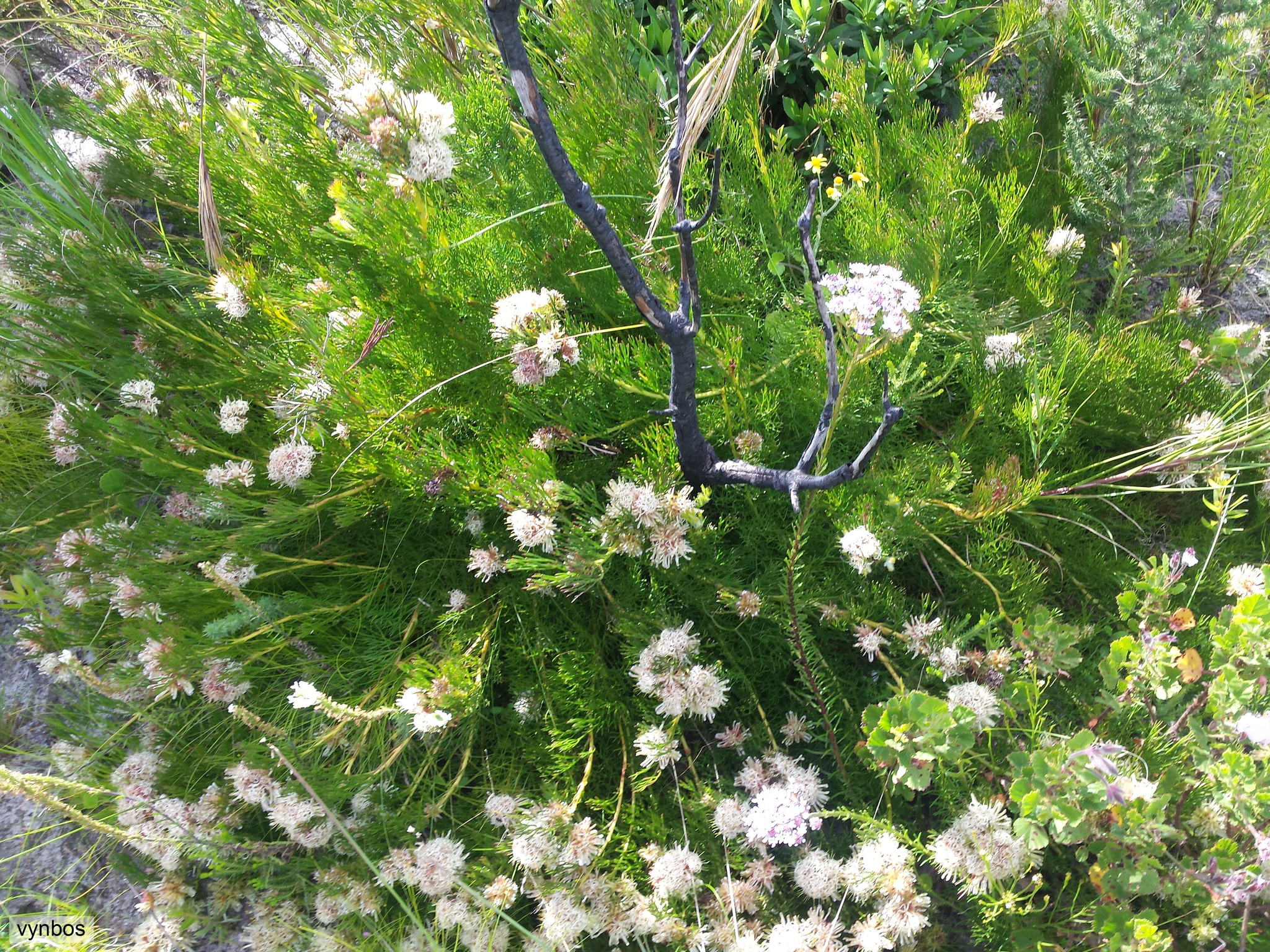

Conservation status
- Endangered (IUCN 3.1)

Scientific classification
- Kingdom: Plantae
- Clade: Tracheophytes
- Clade: Angiosperms
- Clade: Eudicots
- Order: Proteales
- Family: Proteaceae
- Genus: Serruria
- Species: S. collina

Binomial name
- Serruria collina Salisb. ex Knight

Synonyms
- Protea flagellaris (R.Br.) Poir.; Serruria flagellaris R.Br.

= Serruria collina =

Species of flowering plant

Serruria collina, also known as the lost spiderhead, is a flower-bearing shrub that belongs to the genus Serruria and forms part of the fynbos. The plant is native to the Western Cape.

In Afrikaans it is known as verlorespinnekopbos.
