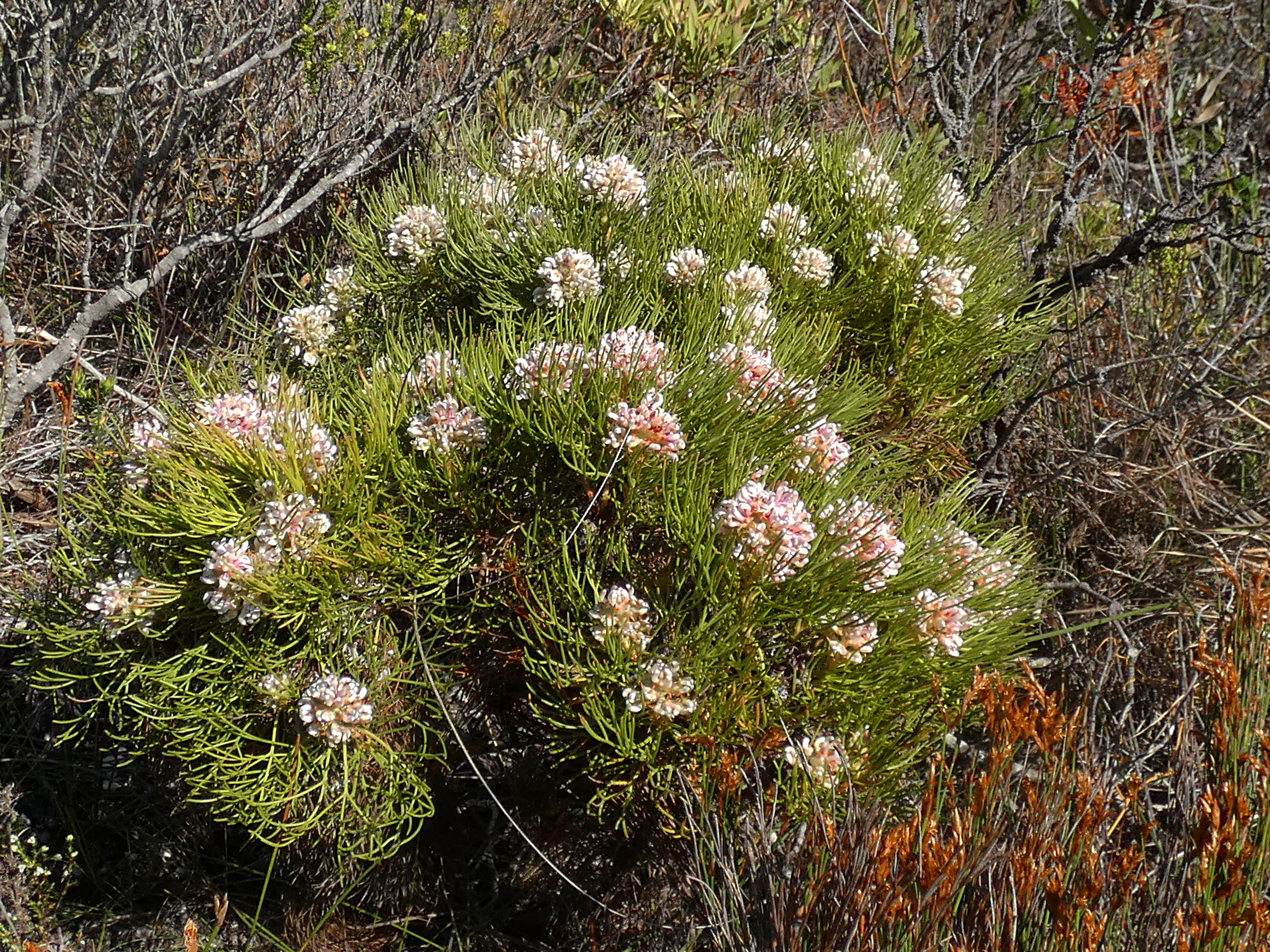

Conservation status
- Near Threatened (IUCN 3.1)

Scientific classification
- Kingdom: Plantae
- Clade: Embryophytes
- Clade: Tracheophytes
- Clade: Angiosperms
- Clade: Eudicots
- Order: Proteales
- Family: Proteaceae
- Genus: Serruria
- Species: S. adscendens

Binomial name
- Serruria adscendens (P.J.Bergius) R.Br.

= Serruria adscendens =

Species of plant endemic to South Africa

Serruria adscendens is a species of flowering plant in the family Proteaceae, endemic to South Africa.
