= Serruria linearis =

Conservation status
- Endangered (IUCN 3.1)

Scientific classification
- Kingdom: Plantae
- Clade: Tracheophytes
- Clade: Angiosperms
- Clade: Eudicots
- Order: Proteales
- Family: Proteaceae
- Genus: Serruria
- Species: S. linearis

Binomial name
- Serruria linearis Salisb. ex Knight

Species of plant

Serruria linearis, the needle-leaf spiderhead, is a flowering shrub that belongs to the genus Serruria and forms part of the fynbos. The plant is endemic to the Western Cape and occurs from Mamre to Dassenberg. The shrub grows upright, reaches a height of 80 cm and flowers from August to November.

The plant's roots sprout again after a fire. Two months after flowering, the fruit falls and ants disperse the seeds. They store the seeds in their nests. The plant is unisexual and pollination takes place through the action of insects. The plant grows in sand at elevations of 120 – 190 m.

== Sources ==
- REDLIST Sanbi
- Biodiversityexplorer
- Protea Atlas
- Plants of the World Online
