= Serruria trilopha =

Conservation status
- Critically Endangered (IUCN 3.1)

Scientific classification
- Kingdom: Plantae
- Clade: Tracheophytes
- Clade: Angiosperms
- Clade: Eudicots
- Order: Proteales
- Family: Proteaceae
- Genus: Serruria
- Species: S. trilopha

Binomial name
- Serruria trilopha Salisb. ex Knight, (1809)

Species of plant

Serruria trilopha, the trident spiderbush, is a flowering shrub that belongs to the genus Serruria and forms part of the fynbos. The plant is endemic to the Western Cape, where it only occurs on the Cape Peninsula and Cape Flats up to Malmesbury. The shrub is upright and grows only 80 cm high and bears flowers from August to October.

Fire destroys the plant but the seeds survive. Two months after flowering, the fruit falls and ants disperse the seeds. They store the seeds in their nests. The plant is bisexual. Pollination takes place through the action of insects. The plant grows in sandy soil at elevations of 50–310 m.

== Sources ==
- REDLIST Sanbi
- PlantZAfrica
- Plants of the World Online
- Protea Atlas
- https://biodiversityexplorer.info/plants/proteaceae/serruria_trilopha.htm
