= Serruria deluvialis =

Conservation status
- Endangered (IUCN 3.1)

Scientific classification
- Kingdom: Plantae
- Clade: Tracheophytes
- Clade: Angiosperms
- Clade: Eudicots
- Order: Proteales
- Family: Proteaceae
- Genus: Serruria
- Species: S. deluvialis

Binomial name
- Serruria deluvialis Rourke, (1990)

Species of flowering plant

Serruria deluvialis, the grass spiderhead, is a flowering shrub that belongs to the genus Serruria and forms part of the fynbos. The species is endemic to the Western Cape and only occurs in the Kogelberg. The shrub grows up to 30 cm tall and flowers from September to November.

The plant grows at elevations of 100 – 300 m.

== Sources ==
- REDLIST Sanbi
- Biodiversityexplorer
- Protea Atlas 1
- Protea Atlas 2
- Cyberleninka
- Plants of the World Online
