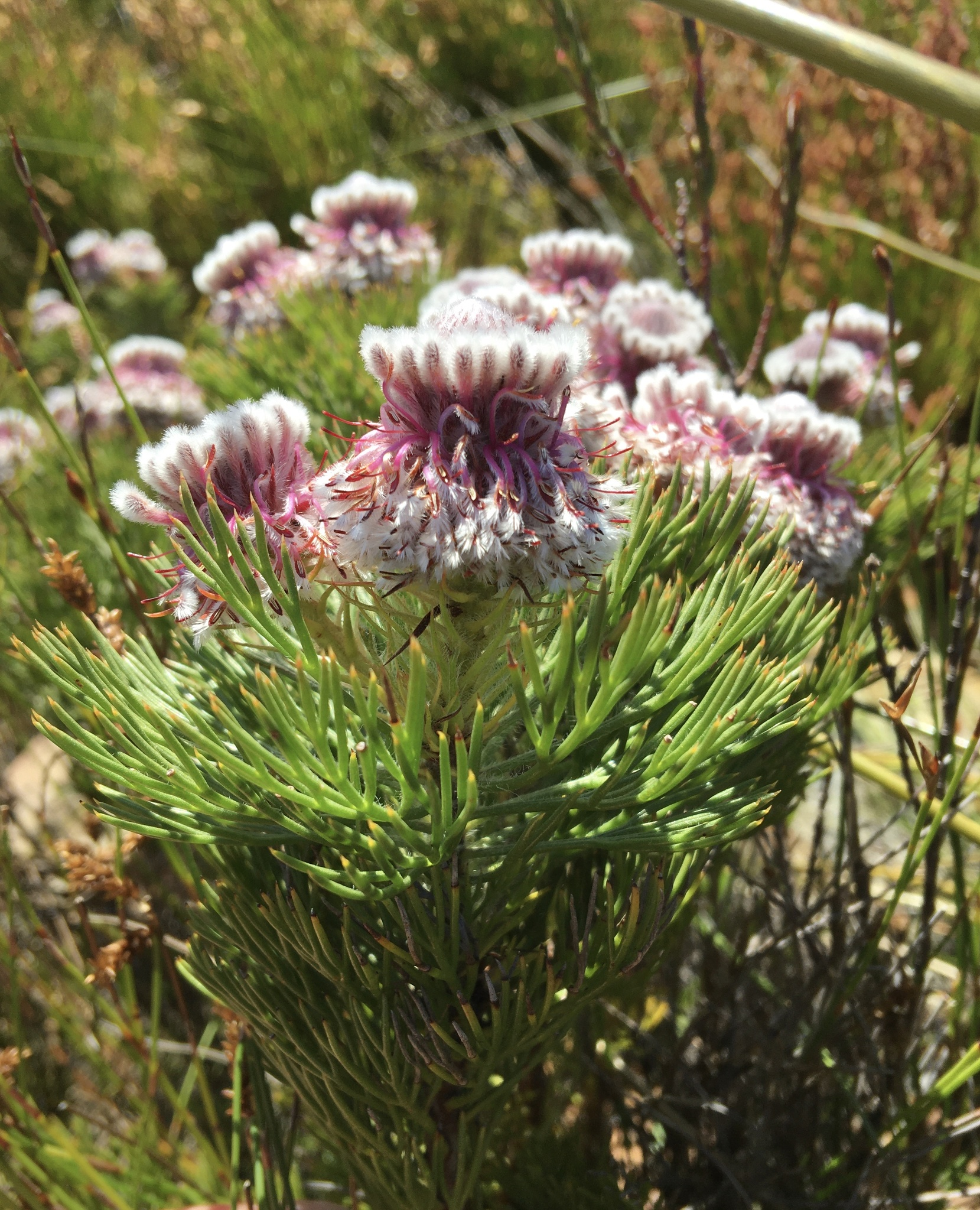

Conservation status
- Vulnerable (IUCN 3.1)

Scientific classification
- Kingdom: Plantae
- Clade: Tracheophytes
- Clade: Angiosperms
- Clade: Eudicots
- Order: Proteales
- Family: Proteaceae
- Genus: Serruria
- Species: S. hirsuta

Binomial name
- Serruria hirsuta R.Br.

= Serruria hirsuta =

Species of plant

Serruria hirsuta, the Swartkops spiderhead, is a flowering shrub that belongs to the genus Serruria and forms part of the fynbos. The plant is endemic to the Western Cape and occurs on the Swartkop Mountain in the southern Cape Peninsula, above Simon's Town. The shrub grows up to 50 cm tall and flowers from June to October.

Fire destroys the plant but the seeds survive. Two months after flowering, the fruit falls and ants disperse the seeds. They store the seeds in their nests. The plant is bisexual. Pollination takes place through the action of insects. The plant grows in sandstone soil at elevations of 360 – 470 m.

== Sources ==
- REDLIST Sanbi
- Biodiversityexplorer
- Protea Atlas
- Plants of the World Online
