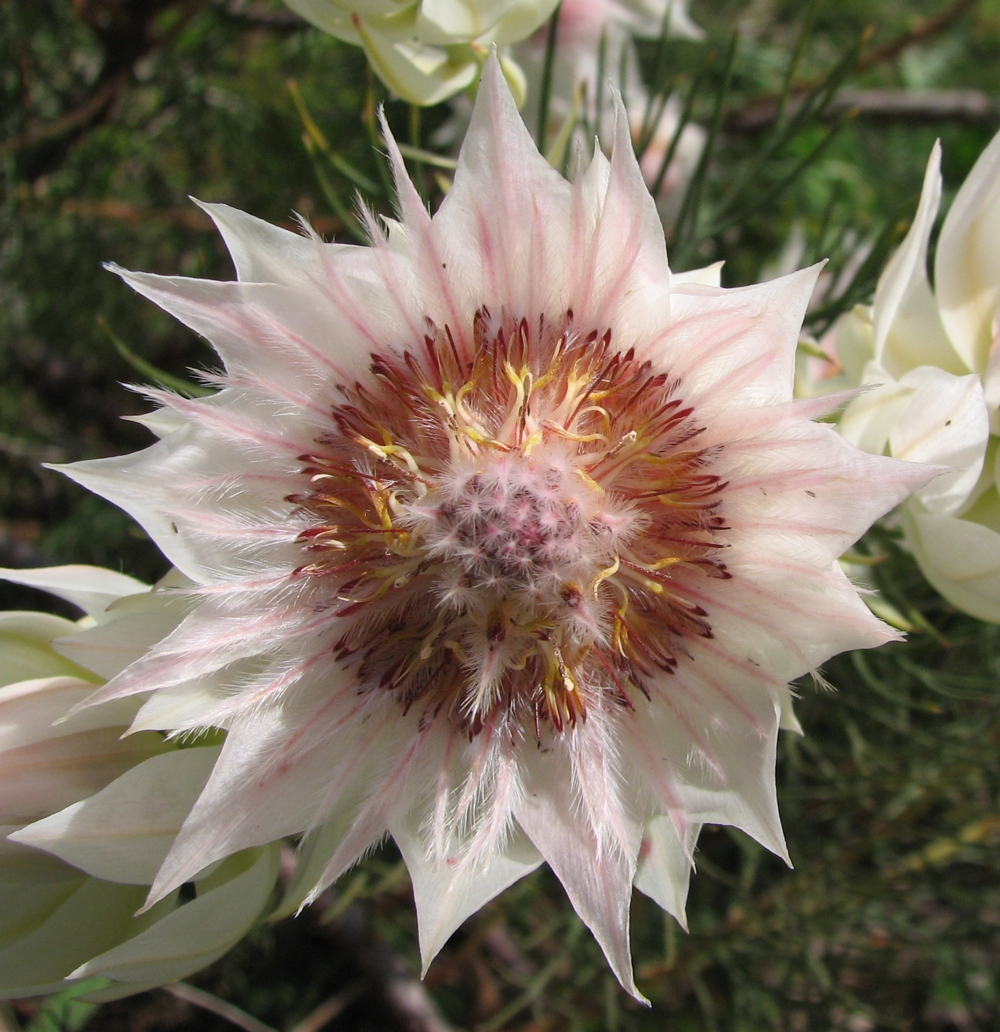
- Serruria florida

Scientific classification
- Kingdom: Plantae
- Clade: Embryophytes
- Clade: Tracheophytes
- Clade: Angiosperms
- Clade: Eudicots
- Order: Proteales
- Family: Proteaceae
- Subfamily: Proteoideae
- Tribe: Leucadendreae
- Subtribe: Leucadendrinae
- Genus: Serruria; Burm. ex Salisb. (1807)

Synonyms
- Holderlinia Neck. (1790), opus utique oppr.

= Serruria =

Genus of flowering plants endemic to South Africa

Serruria, or spiderhead is a genus of flowering plants in the family Proteaceae, endemic to South Africa.

== Names ==
Serruria was named in honor of Joseph Serrurier, a professor of botany at the Utrecht University early in the eighteenth century. It is called spiderhead in English and spinnekopbos in Afrikaans, because of the silky, finely divided leaves looking like they are covered in spiders webs.

== Selected species ==
Species include:

- Serruria acrocarpa R.Br.
- Serruria adscendens (Lam.) R.Br.
- Serruria aemula Salisb. ex Knight
- Serruria aitonii R.Br.
- Serruria altiscapa Rourke
- Serruria balanocephala Rourke
- Serruria bolusii E.Phillips & Hutch.
- Serruria brownii Meisn.
- Serruria candicans R.Br.
- Serruria collina Salisb. ex Knight
- Serruria confragosa Rourke
- Serruria cyanoides (L.) R.Br.
- Serruria cygnea R.Br.
- Serruria decipiens R.Br.
- Serruria decumbens (Thunb.) R.Br.
- Serruria deluvialis Rourke
- Serruria dodii E.Phillips & Hutch.
- Serruria effusa Rourke
- Serruria elongata (P.J.Bergius) R.Br.
- Serruria fasciflora Salisb. ex Knight
- Serruria flagellifolia Salisb. ex Knight
- Serruria flava Meisn.
- Serruria florida (Thunb.) Salisb. ex Knight
- Serruria fucifolia Salisb. ex Knight
- Serruria furcellata R.Br.
- Serruria glomerata (L.) R.Br.
- Serruria gracilis Knight
- Serruria gremialis Rourke
- Serruria heterophylla Meisn.
- Serruria hirsuta R.Br.
- Serruria inconspicua L.Guthrie & T.M.Salter
- Serruria incrassata Meisn.
- Serruria kraussii Meisn.
- Serruria lacunosa Rourke
- Serruria leipoldtii E.Phillips & Hutch.
- Serruria linearis Salisb. ex Knight
- Serruria meisneriana Schltr.
- Serruria millefolia Salisb. ex Knight
- Serruria nervosa Meisn.
- Serruria nivenii Salisb. ex Knight
- Serruria pedunculata (Lam.) R.Br.
- Serruria phylicoides (P.J.Bergius) R.Br.
- Serruria pinnata R.Br.
- Serruria rebeloi Rourke
- Serruria reflexa Rourke
- Serruria rosea E.Phillips
- Serruria rostellaris Salisb. ex Knight
- Serruria roxburghii R.Br.
- Serruria rubricaulis R.Br.
- Serruria scoparia R.Br.
- Serruria stellata Rourke
- Serruria trilopha Salisb. ex Knight
- Serruria triternata (Thunb.) R.Br.
- Serruria villosa (Lam.) R.Br.
- Serruria viridifolia Rourke
- Serruria williamsii Rourke
- Serruria zeyheri Meisn.
