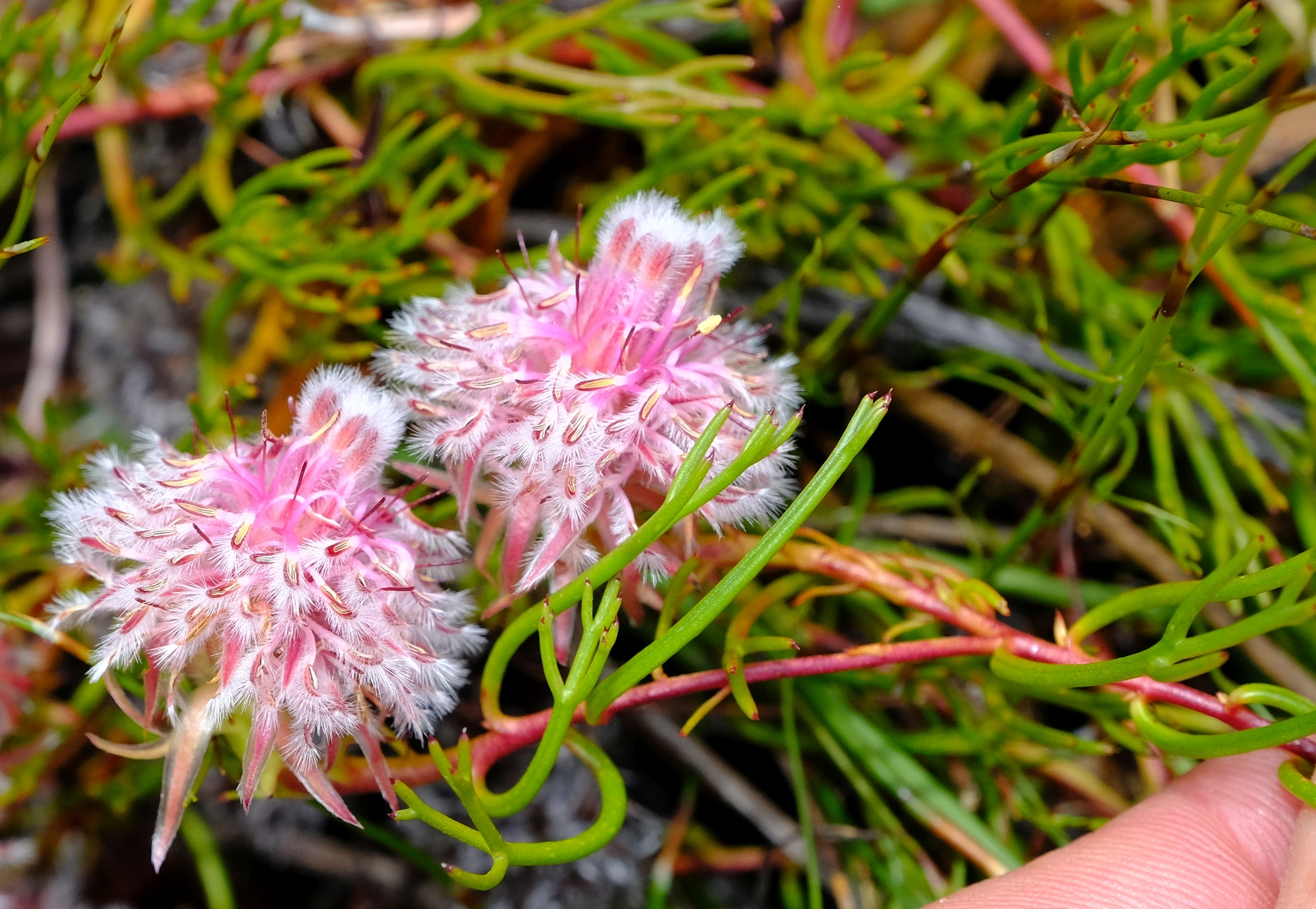

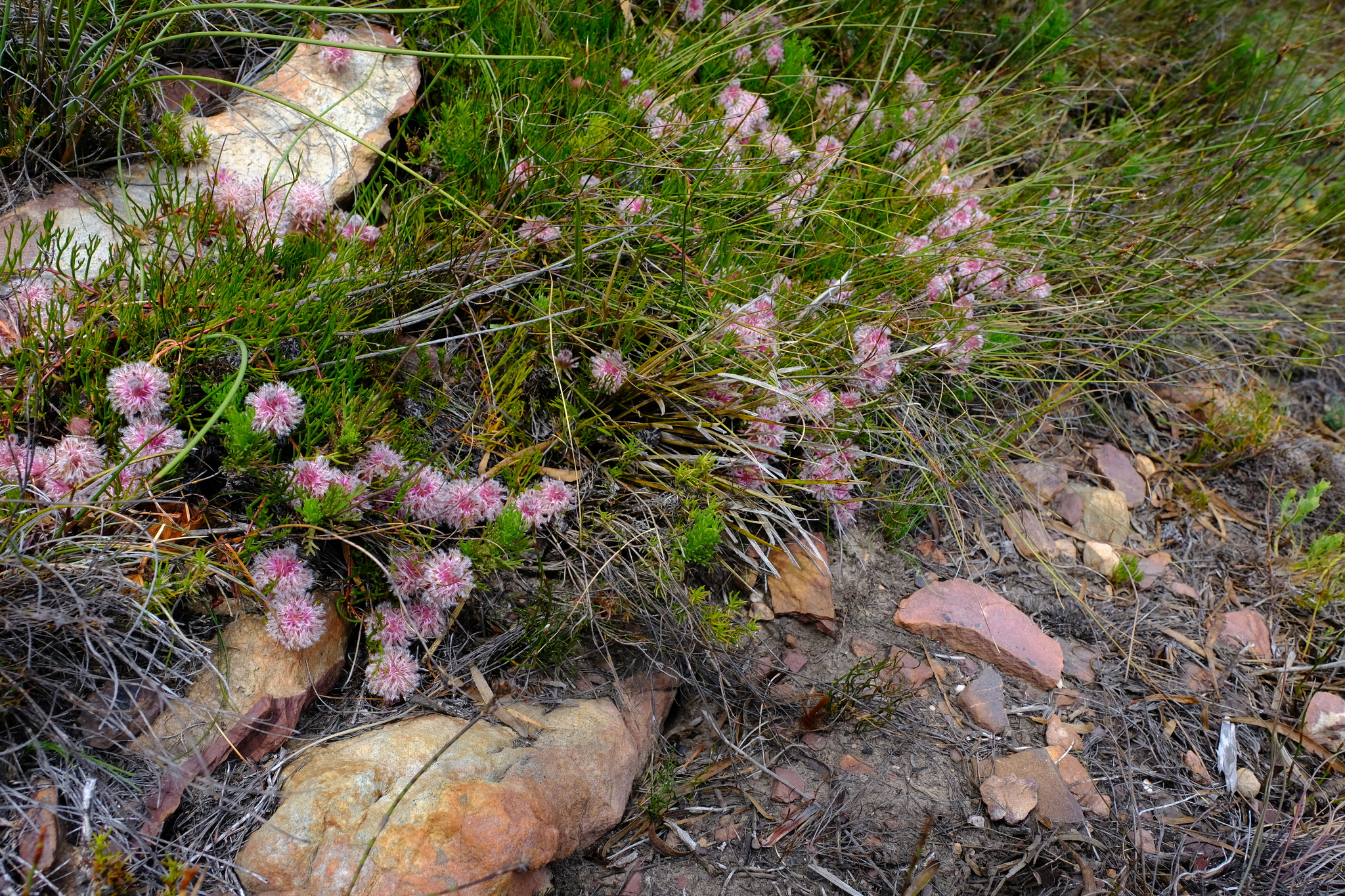

Conservation status
- Vulnerable (IUCN 3.1)

Scientific classification
- Kingdom: Plantae
- Clade: Tracheophytes
- Clade: Angiosperms
- Clade: Eudicots
- Order: Proteales
- Family: Proteaceae
- Genus: Serruria
- Species: S. stellata

Binomial name
- Serruria stellata Rourke

= Serruria stellata =

Species of flowering plant

Serruria stellata, the star spiderhead, is a flower-bearing shrub that belongs to the genus Serruria and forms part of the fynbos. The plant is native to the Western Cape, South Africa.

== Description ==
The shrub is small with creeping stems and grows only 20 cm (7.9 in) tall and flowers from September to November. Fire destroys the plant but the seeds survive. Two months after flowering, the fruit falls off and ants disperse the seeds. They store the seeds in their nests. The plant is unisexual and pollinated by insects.

In Afrikaans, it is known as sterspinnekopbos.

== Distribution and habitat ==
The plant occurs from the Stettyns Mountains to the western Riviersonderend Mountains. It grows in sandstone sand at elevations of 900–1,200 m (3,000–3,900 ft).
