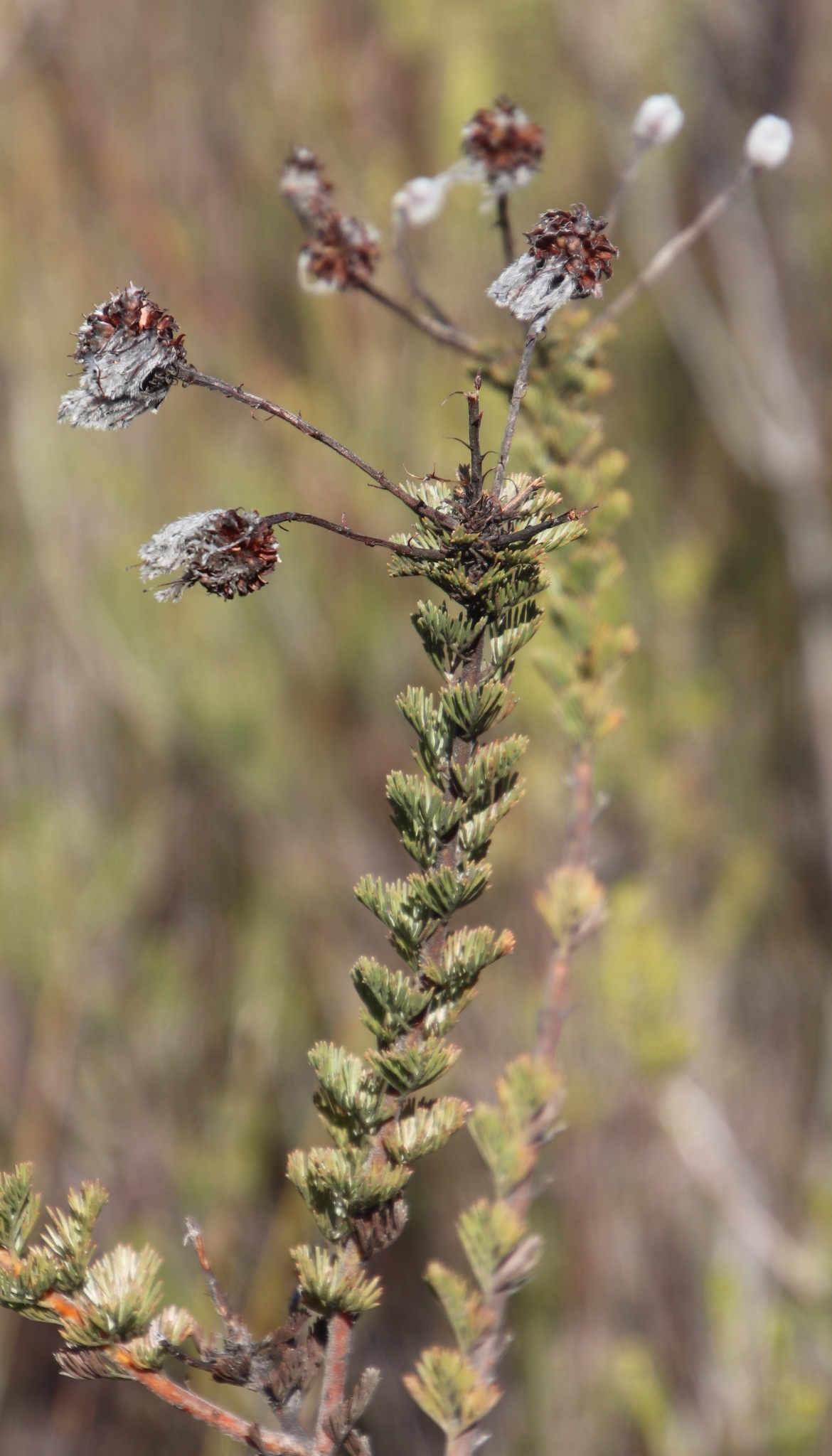

Conservation status
- Least Concern (IUCN 3.1)

Scientific classification
- Kingdom: Plantae
- Clade: Tracheophytes
- Clade: Angiosperms
- Clade: Eudicots
- Order: Proteales
- Family: Proteaceae
- Genus: Serruria
- Species: S. reflexa

Binomial name
- Serruria reflexa Rourke

= Serruria reflexa =

Species of plant

Serruria reflexa, the milky spiderhead, is a flowering shrub that belongs to the genus Serruria and forms part of the fynbos. The plant is endemic to the Western Cape and occurs from the Koue Bokkeveld to the Olifants River Mountains between The Baths and Porterville. The shrub grows erect, reaches 2.0 m in height and flowers from September to November.

The plant dies after a fire but the seeds survive. Two months after flowering, the fruit falls and ants disperse the seeds. They store the seeds in their nests. Pollination takes place through the action of insects, especially bees. The plant grows in sandstone soil at elevations of 400 – 760 m.

== Sources ==
- REDLIST Sanbi
- Biodiversityexplorer
- Protea Atlas
- iNaturatlist
- Plant of the World Online
