= Serruria millefolia =

Conservation status
- Endangered (IUCN 3.1)

Scientific classification
- Kingdom: Plantae
- Clade: Tracheophytes
- Clade: Angiosperms
- Clade: Eudicots
- Order: Proteales
- Family: Proteaceae
- Genus: Serruria
- Species: S. millefolia

Binomial name
- Serruria millefolia Salisb. ex Knight

Species of plant

Serruria millefolia, the millileaf spiderhead, is a flowering shrub that belongs to the genus Serruria and forms part of the fynbos. The plant is endemic to the Western Cape and occurs in the Sandveld from the Bokkeveld Mountains escarpment to the Olifants River Mountains. The shrub grows upright, only 50 cm high and flowers from August to December

Fire destroys the plant but the seeds survive. Two months after flowering, the fruit falls and ants disperse the seeds. They store the seeds in their nests. The plant is unisexual. Pollination takes place through the action of insects. The plant grows in sandy soil at elevations of 350 – 800 m.

== Sources ==
- REDLIST Sanbi
- Biodiversityexplorer
- Protea Atlas 1
- Protea Atlas 2
- Plants of the World Online
