= Serruria triternata =

Conservation status
- Vulnerable (IUCN 3.1)

Scientific classification
- Kingdom: Plantae
- Clade: Tracheophytes
- Clade: Angiosperms
- Clade: Eudicots
- Order: Proteales
- Family: Proteaceae
- Genus: Serruria
- Species: S. triternata

Binomial name
- Serruria triternata (Thunb.) R.Br., (1810)

Species of plant

Serruria triternata, the Tulbagh spiderbush, is a flowering shrub that belongs to the genus Serruria and forms part of the fynbos. The plant is endemic to the Western Cape and only occurs in the Elandskloof Mountains near Tulbagh. The shrub is upright and reaches 1.0 m in height and flowers in September.

Fire destroys the plant but the seeds survive. Two months after flowering, the fruit falls and ants disperse the seeds. They store the seeds in their nests. The plant is unisexual. Pollination takes place through the action of beetles, butterflies and moths. The plant grows on slopes at elevations of 400 – 950 m.

== Sources ==
- REDLIST Sanbi
- Biodiversityexplorer
- PlantZAfrica
- Protea Atlas
- Plants of the World Online
