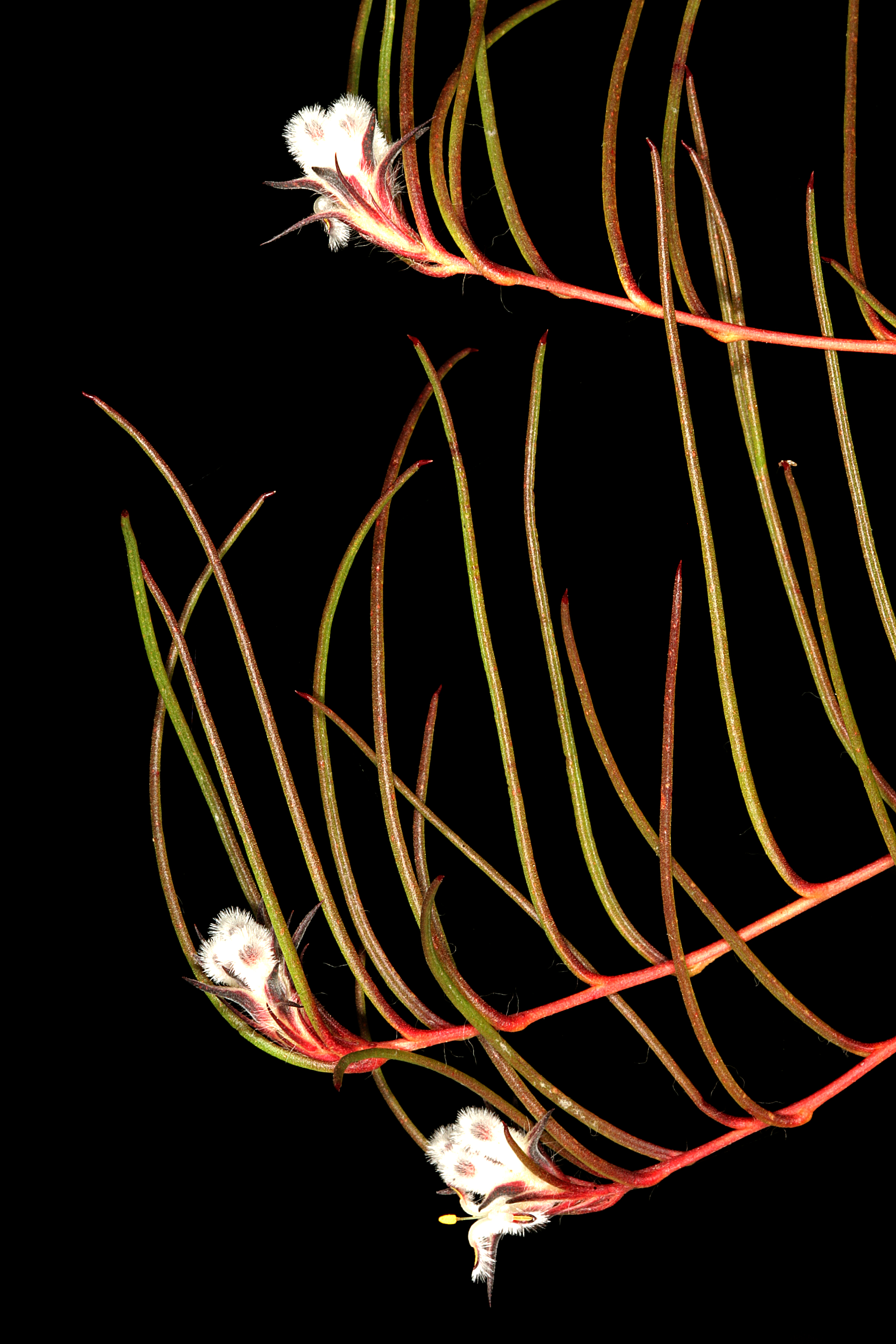

Conservation status
- Endangered (IUCN 3.1)

Scientific classification
- Kingdom: Plantae
- Clade: Tracheophytes
- Clade: Angiosperms
- Clade: Eudicots
- Order: Proteales
- Family: Proteaceae
- Genus: Serruria
- Species: S. rebeloi

Binomial name
- Serruria rebeloi Rourke

= Serruria rebeloi =

Species of plant

Serruria rebeloi, the clandestine spiderhead, is a flowering shrub that belongs to the genus Serruria and forms part of the fynbos. The plant is endemic to the Western Cape and occurs in the Akkedisberg and Bredasdorp mountains. The shrub is flat and grows only 20 cm high and flowers from September to October

Fire destroys the plant but the seeds survive. Two months after flowering, the fruit falls and ants disperse the seeds. They store the seeds in their nests. The plant is unisexual. Pollination takes place through the action of insects. The plant grows in sandy soil at elevations of 200 m.

This plant is rare and was only discovered in the early 2000s as part of the Protea Atlas Project.

== Sources ==
- REDLIST Sanbi
- Biodiversityexplorer
- Protea Atlas
- Plants of the World Online
