= Serruria viridifolia =

Conservation status
- Vulnerable (IUCN 3.1)

Scientific classification
- Kingdom: Plantae
- Clade: Tracheophytes
- Clade: Angiosperms
- Clade: Eudicots
- Order: Proteales
- Family: Proteaceae
- Genus: Serruria
- Species: S. viridifolia

Binomial name
- Serruria viridifolia Rourke

Species of plant

Serruria viridifolia, the mat spiderhead, is a flowering shrub that belongs to the genus Serruria and forms part of the fynbos. The plant is endemic to the Western Cape, is rare and occurs in the Riviersonderendberge from Jonaskop to Wolfieskop. The shrub tends to form a mat, grows 1.0 cm tall and flowers from July to November.

A fire destroys the plant but the seeds survive. Two months after flowering, the fruit falls and ants disperse the seeds. They store the seeds in their nests. The plant is unisexual and pollination takes place through the action of insects. The plant grows in sand on sandstone slopes at elevations of 800 - 1,100 m.

== Sources ==
- REDLIST Sanbi
- Biodiversityexplorer
- Protea Atlas
- Plants of the World Online
