= Serruria zeyheri =

Conservation status
- Endangered (IUCN 3.1)

Scientific classification
- Kingdom: Plantae
- Clade: Embryophytes
- Clade: Tracheophytes
- Clade: Spermatophytes
- Clade: Angiosperms
- Clade: Eudicots
- Order: Proteales
- Family: Proteaceae
- Genus: Serruria
- Species: S. zeyheri

Binomial name
- Serruria zeyheri Meisn.

Species of plant

Serruria zeyheri, the matchstick spiderbush, is a flowering shrub that belongs to the genus Serruria and forms part of the fynbos. The plant is endemic to the Western Cape and occurs from the Du Toitskloof Mountains to the Riviersonderend Mountains, possibly also in the Greenland Mountain. The shrub is upright and grows 50 cm high and flowers from August to November.

Fire destroys the plant but the seeds survive. Two months after flowering, the fruit falls and ants disperse the seeds. They store the seeds in their nests. The plant is unisexual. Pollination takes place through the action of insects. The plant grows on sandstone and peaty slopes at elevations of 280 – 1000 m.

== Sources ==
- REDLIST Online
- Biodiversityexplorer
- Protea Atlas
- Plants of the World Online
