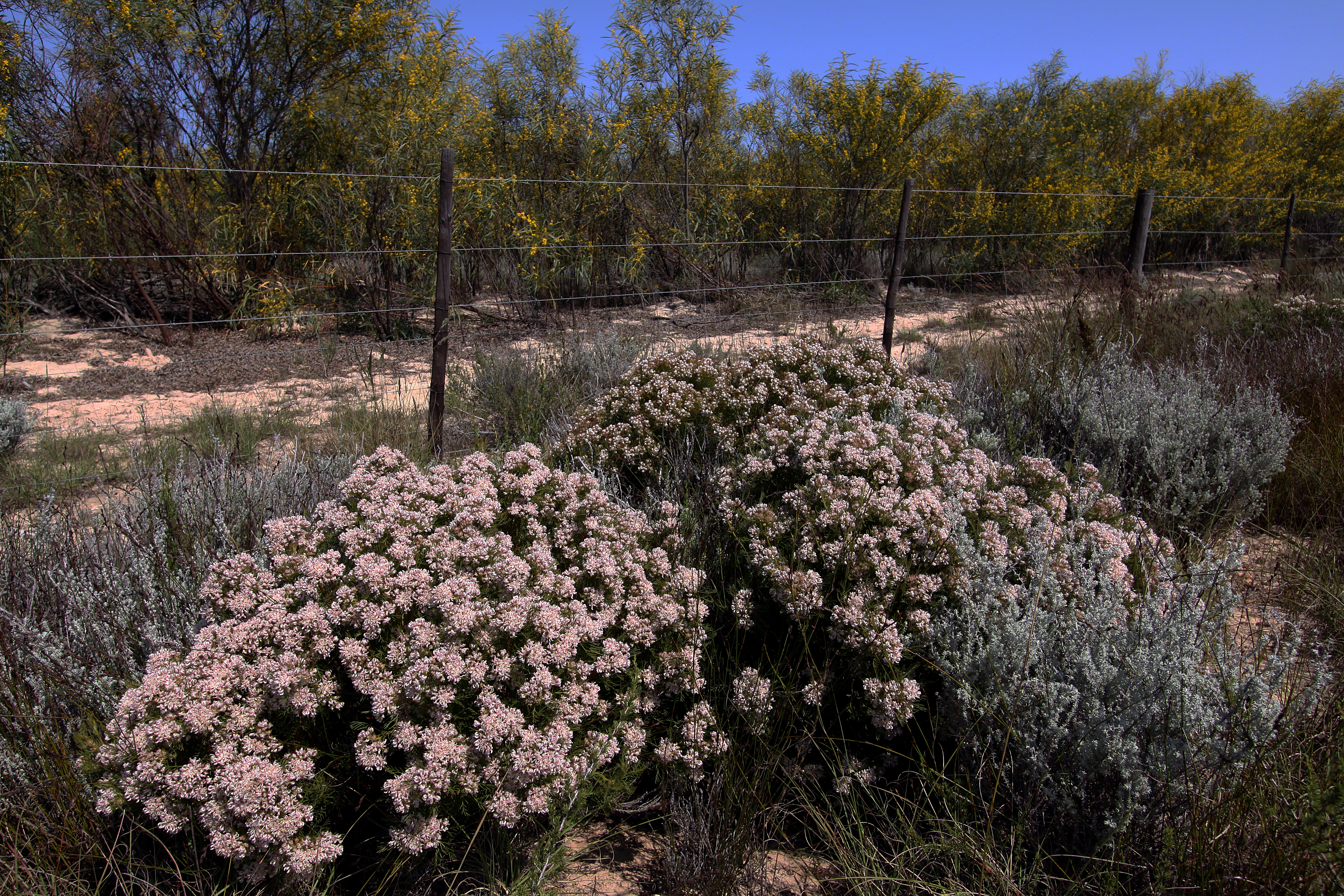

Conservation status
- Near Threatened (IUCN 3.1)

Scientific classification
- Kingdom: Plantae
- Clade: Tracheophytes
- Clade: Angiosperms
- Clade: Eudicots
- Order: Proteales
- Family: Proteaceae
- Genus: Serruria
- Species: S. decipiens

Binomial name
- Serruria decipiens R.Br.

= Serruria decipiens =

Species of flowering plant

Serruria decipiens, the Sandveld spiderhead, is a flower-bearing shrub that belongs to the genus Serruria. It forms part of the fynbos biome. The plant is native to the Western Cape, where it only occurs on the Sandveld, Hopefield, the Cape Flats, Piketberg, and Olifants River Mountains. The shrub is round and grows 1.0 m tall and bears flowers from July to October.

Fire destroys the plant but the seeds survive. Two months after flowering, the fruit falls off and ants disperse the seeds. They store the seeds in their nests. The plant is bisexual. Pollination takes place through the action of insects. The plant grows in sandy soil at elevations of 0–250 m.
