= Serruria altiscapa =

Conservation status
- Endangered (IUCN 3.1)

Scientific classification
- Kingdom: Plantae
- Clade: Tracheophytes
- Clade: Angiosperms
- Clade: Eudicots
- Order: Proteales
- Family: Proteaceae
- Genus: Serruria
- Species: S. altiscapa

Binomial name
- Serruria altiscapa Rourke

Species of plant

Serruria altiscapa, the stately spiderhead, is a flower-bearing shrub that belongs to the genus Serruria and forms part of the fynbos. The plant is native to the Western Cape and occurs at Blokkop in Villiersdorp as far as the Hottentots-Holland Mountains.

The plant grows at elevations of 700–1,250 m (2,300–4,100 ft). It occurs with Serruria elongata.
