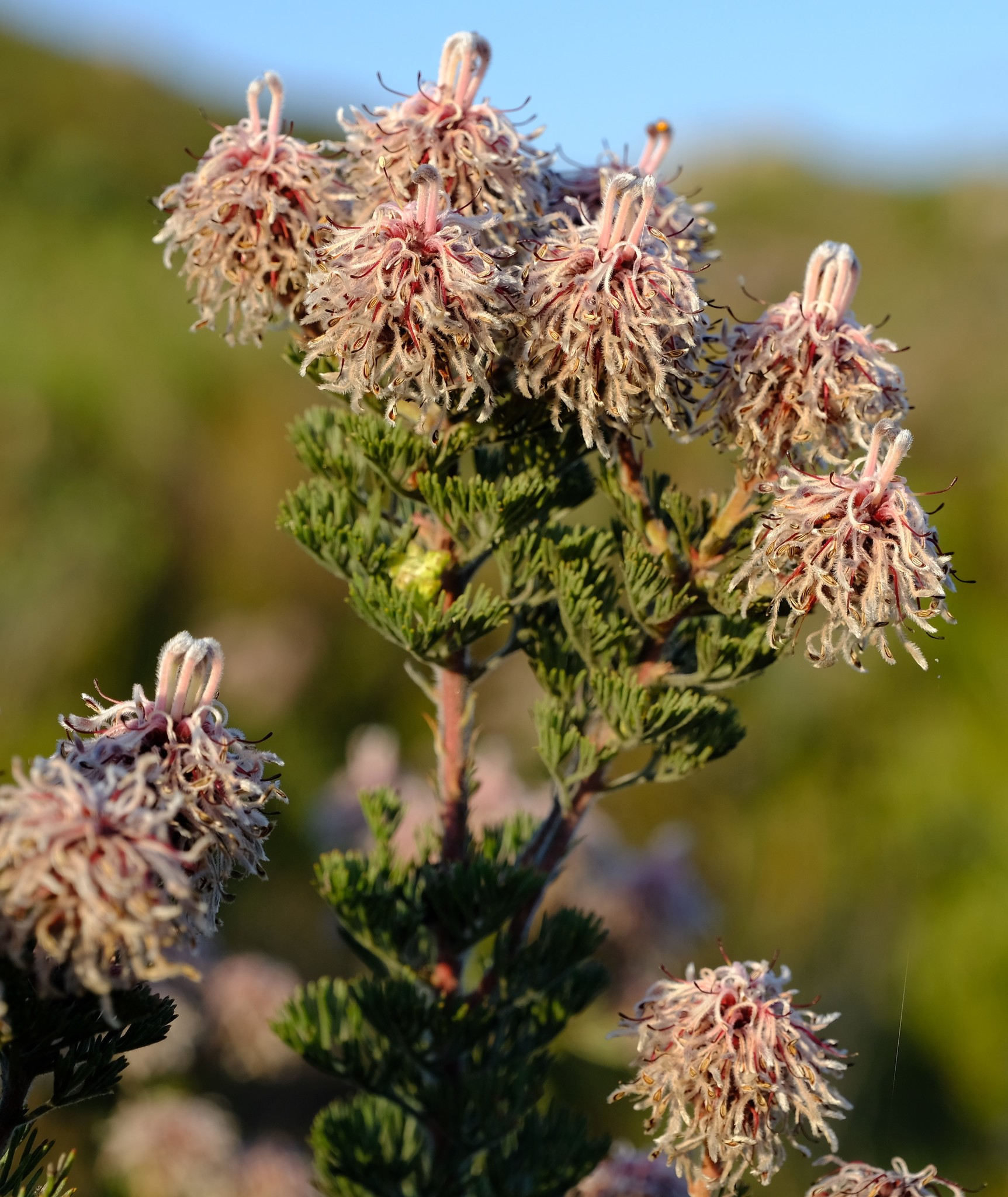

Conservation status
- Least Concern (IUCN 3.1)

Scientific classification
- Kingdom: Plantae
- Clade: Tracheophytes
- Clade: Angiosperms
- Clade: Eudicots
- Order: Proteales
- Family: Proteaceae
- Genus: Serruria
- Species: S. aitonii

Binomial name
- Serruria aitonii R.Br.

= Serruria aitonii =

Species of plant

Serruria aitonii, the marshmallow spiderhead, is a flower-bearing shrub that belongs to the genus Serruria and forms part of the fynbos. The plant is native to the Western Cape and occurs from the Cederberg and Sandveld to the Groot-Winterhoek Mountains and Piketberg. The shrub is round and grows 1.0 m tall and flowers from July to November.

Fire destroys the plant but the seeds survive. Two months after flowering, the fruit falls off and ants disperse the seeds. They store the seeds in their nests. The plant is unisexual. Pollination takes place through the action of insects. The plant grows in a mountainous environment in rocky sandstone soil at elevations of 900–600 m.

In Afrikaans it is known as malvalekker-spinnekopbos.

== Gallery ==
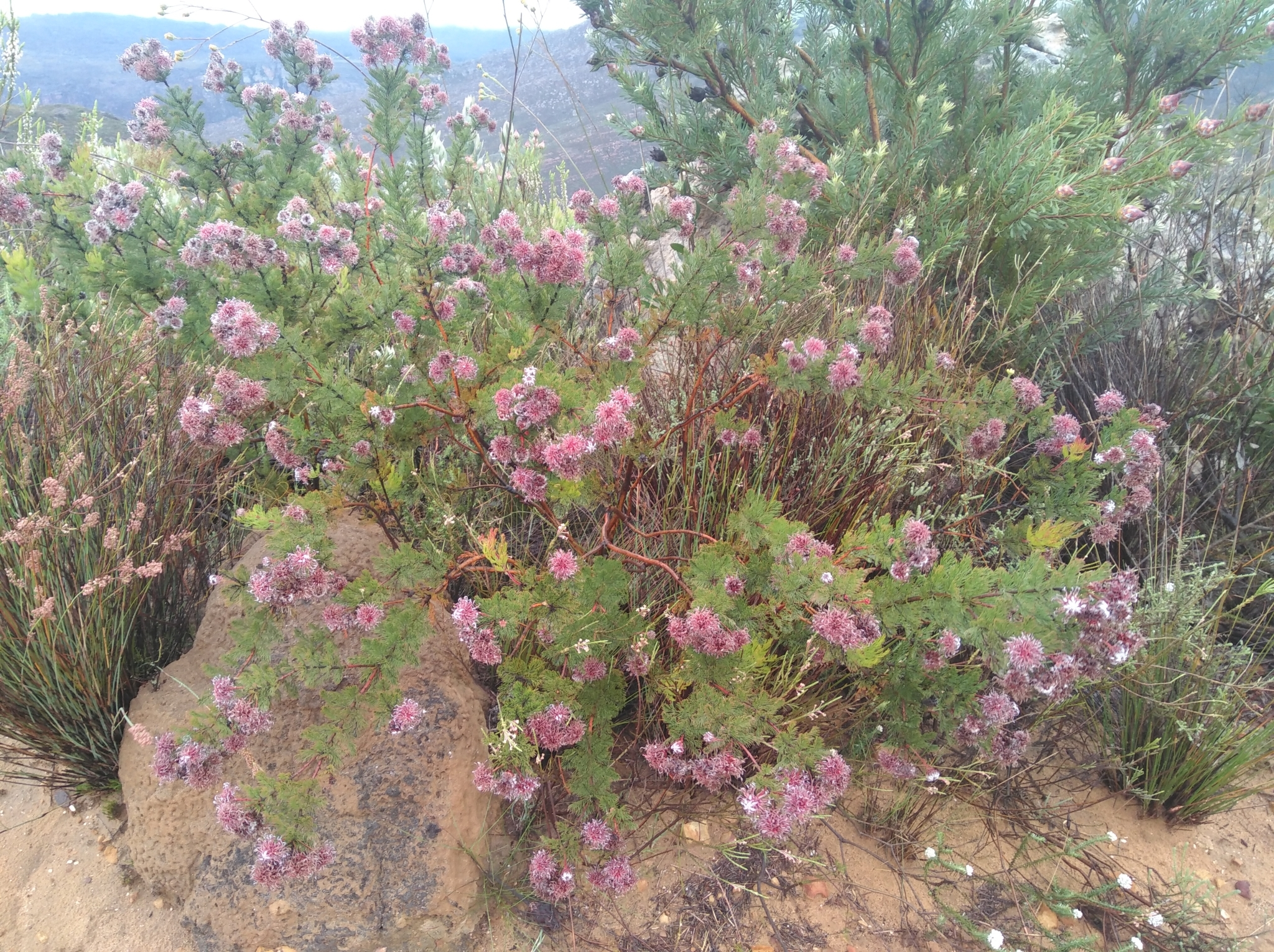

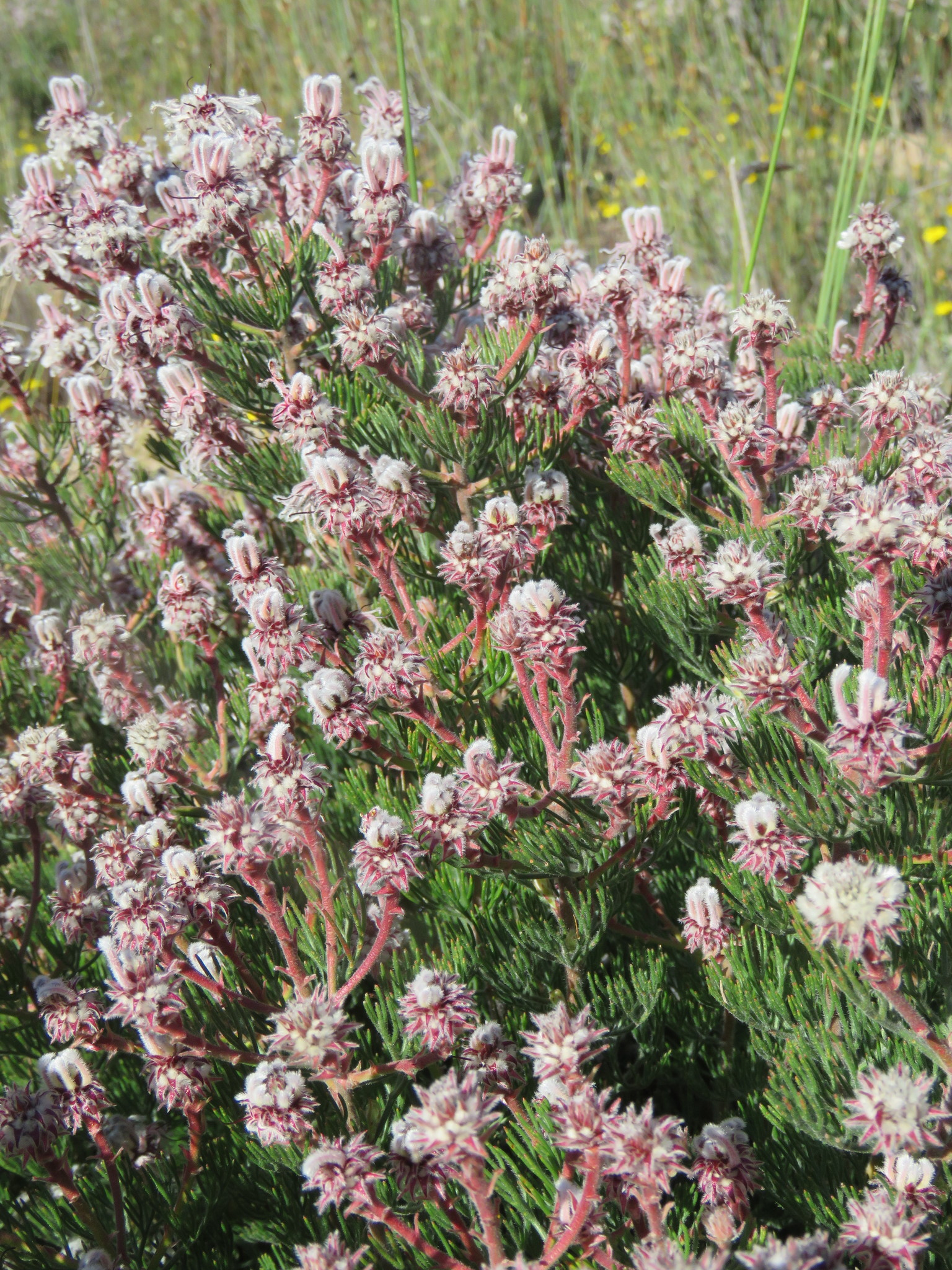

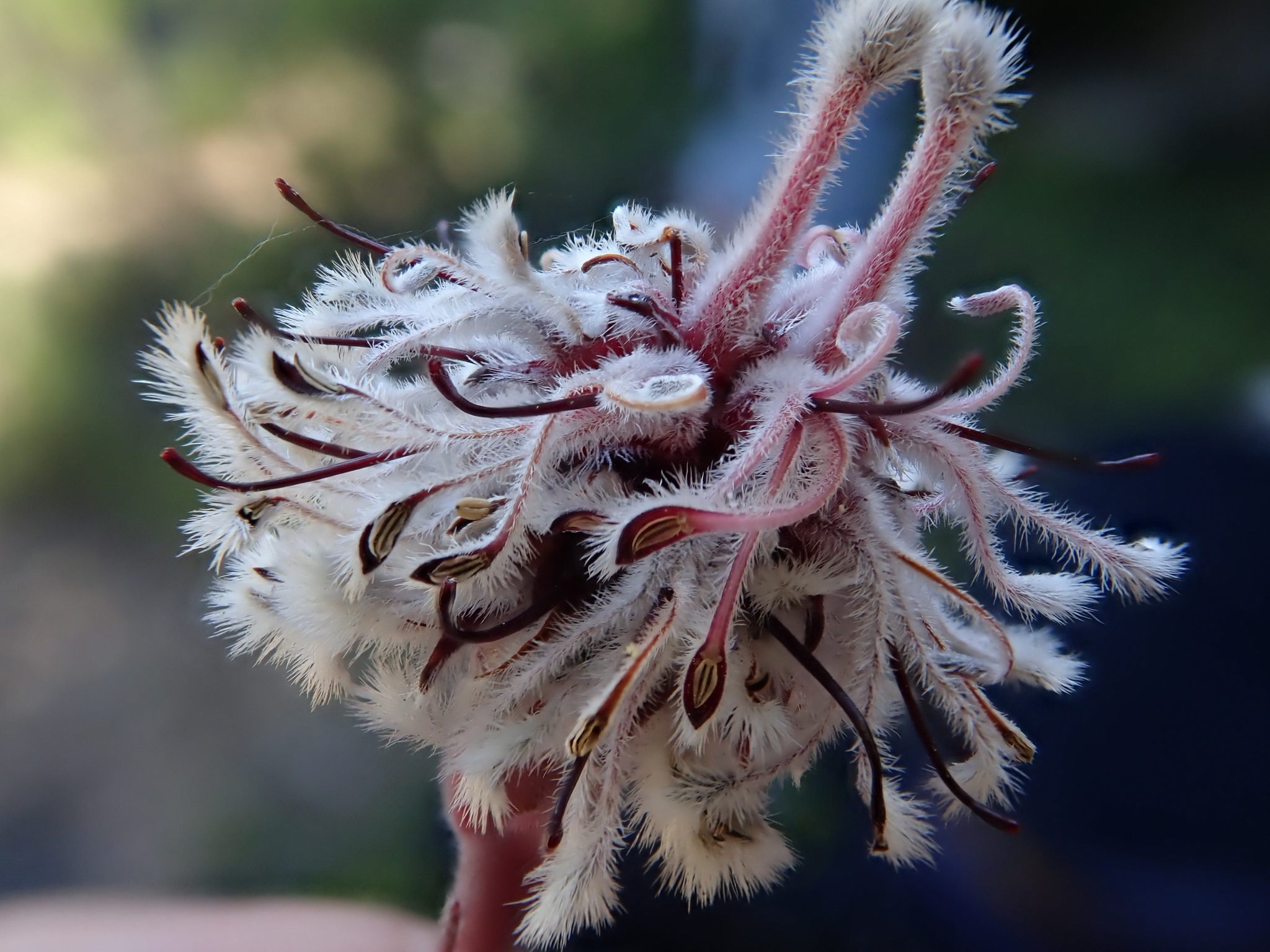

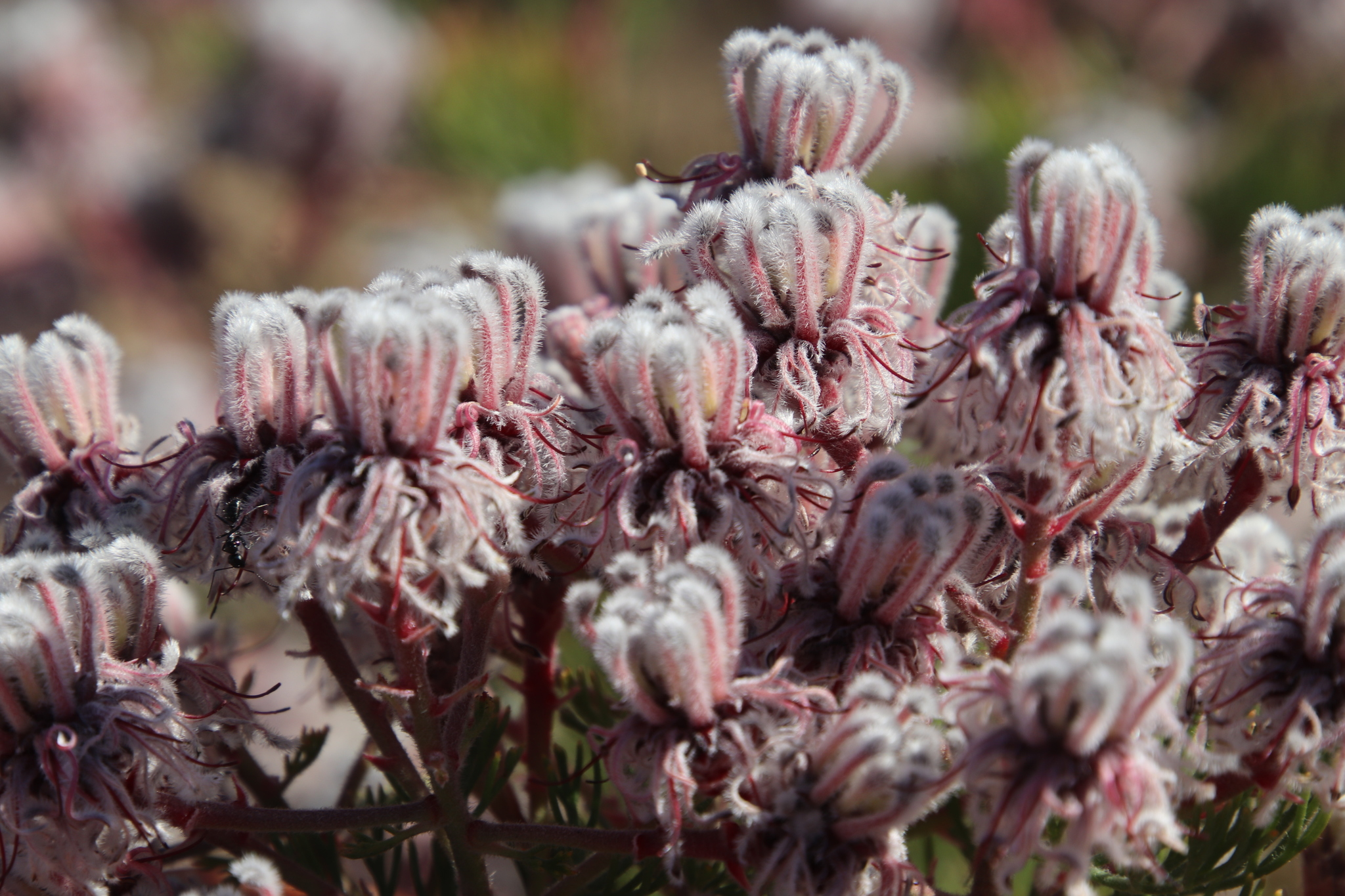

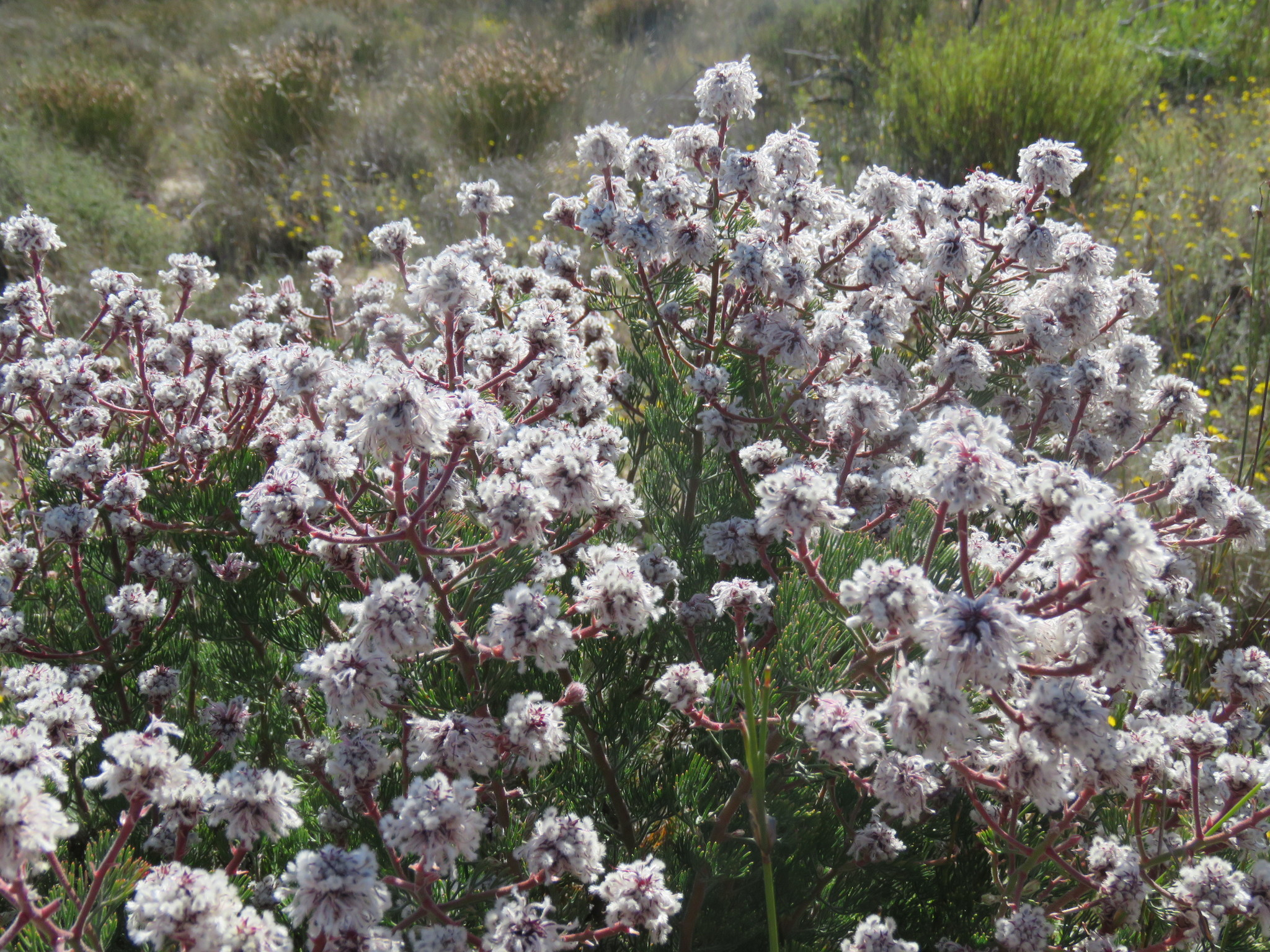

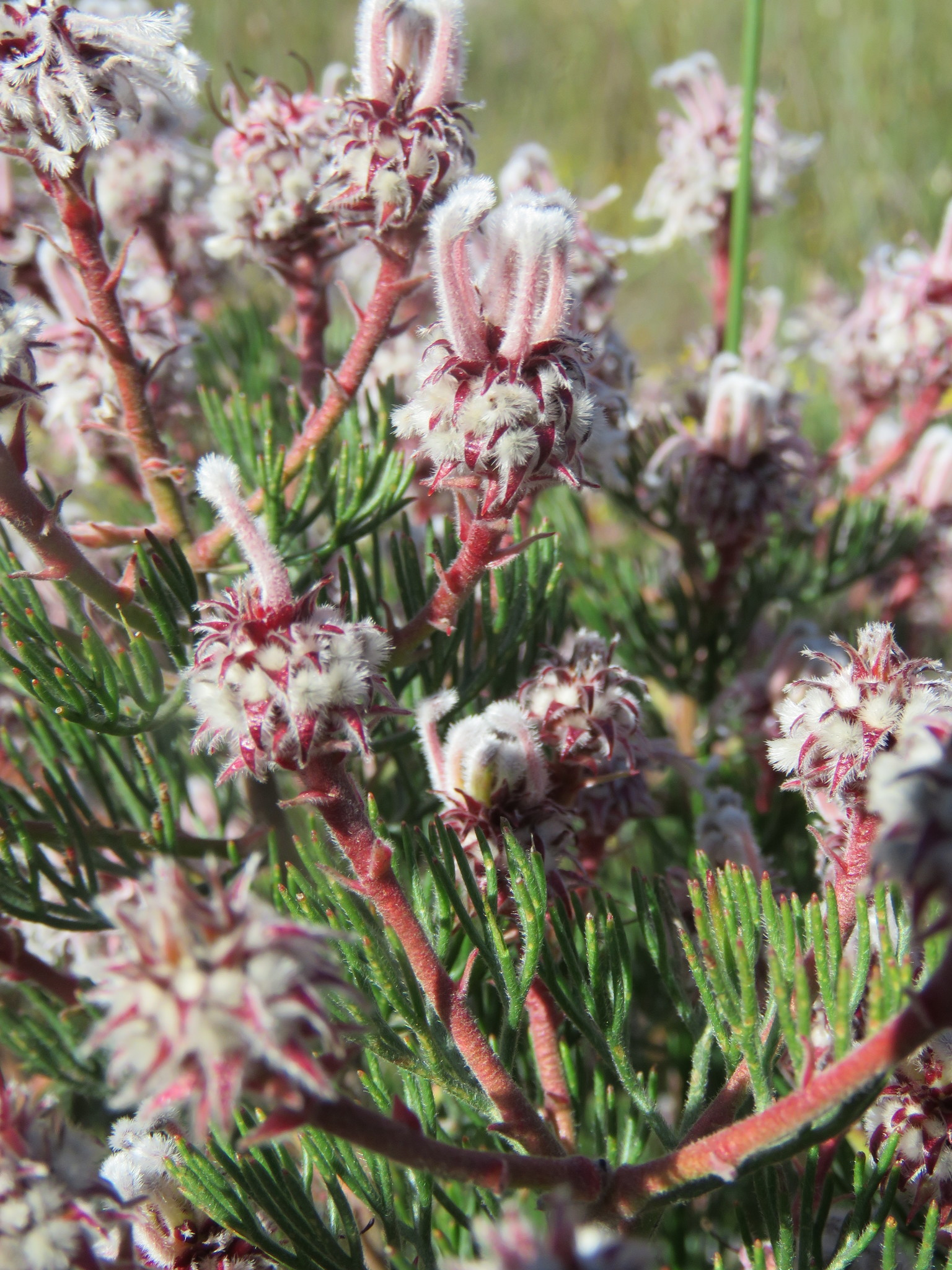

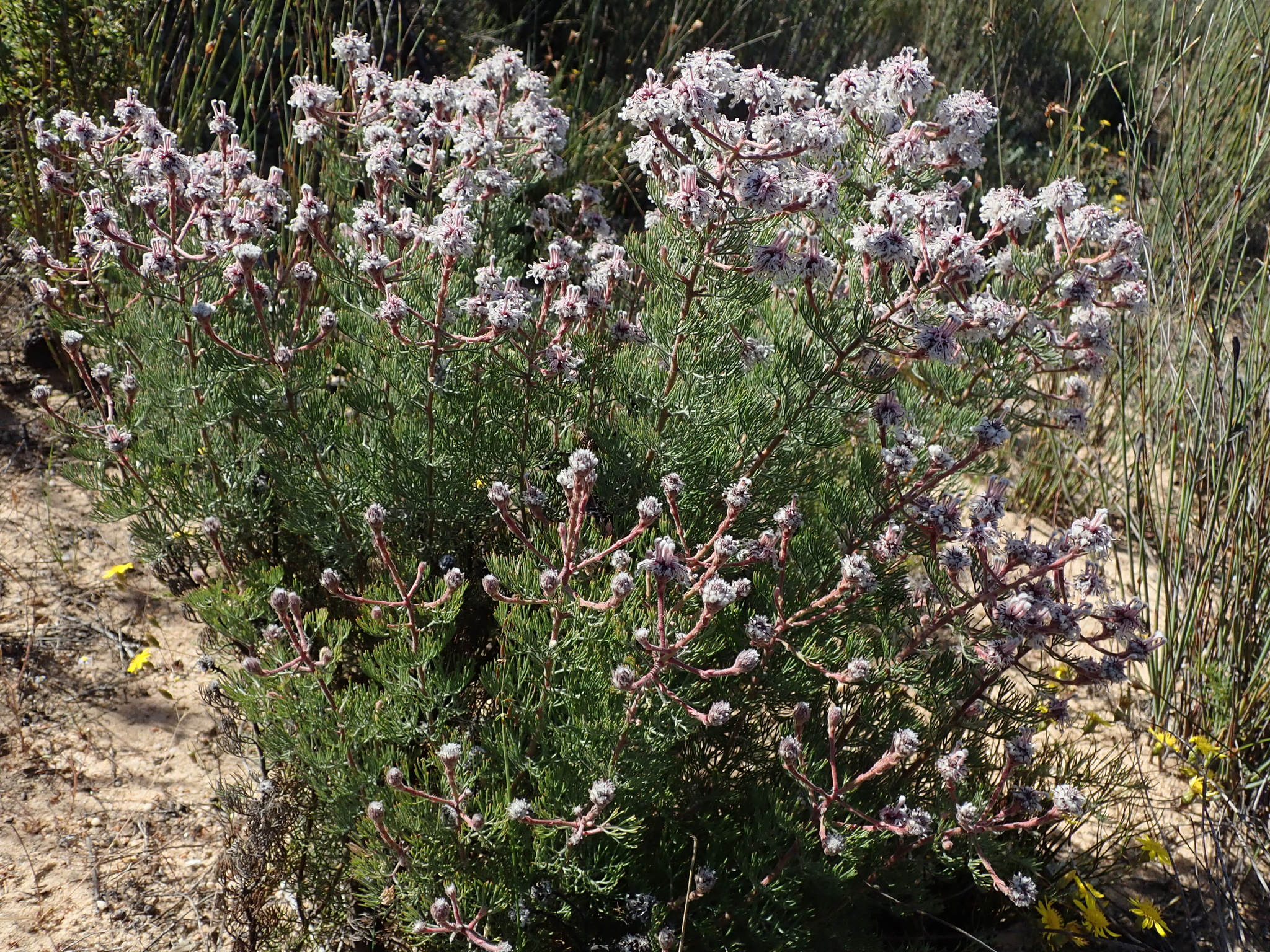

== Sources ==
- Threatened Species Programme | SANBI Red List of South African Plants
- Serruria aitonii (Marshmallow spiderhead)
- Paw Spiderheads
