= Serruria scoparia =

Conservation status
- Critically Endangered (IUCN 3.1)

Scientific classification
- Kingdom: Plantae
- Clade: Tracheophytes
- Clade: Angiosperms
- Clade: Eudicots
- Order: Proteales
- Family: Proteaceae
- Genus: Serruria
- Species: S. scoparia

Binomial name
- Serruria scoparia R.Br.

Species of plant

Serruria scoparia, the forlorn spiderhead, is a flowering shrub that belongs to the genus Serruria and forms part of the fynbos. The plant is endemic to the Western Cape and occurs from Riebeeck-East to the Paarl. The shrub is small with creeping stems and grows to only 40 cm high and flowers from August to October.

The plant's roots can sprout again after a fire. Two months after flowering, the fruit falls and ants disperse the seeds. They store the seeds in their nests. The plant is unisexual. Pollination takes place through the action of insects. The plant grows in sandy soil at elevations of 100 m.

== Sources ==
- REDLIST Sanbi
- Biodiversityexplorer
- Protea Atlas
- Plants of the World Online
