= Serruria roxburghii =

Conservation status
- Endangered (IUCN 3.1)

Scientific classification
- Kingdom: Plantae
- Clade: Tracheophytes
- Clade: Angiosperms
- Clade: Eudicots
- Order: Proteales
- Family: Proteaceae
- Genus: Serruria
- Species: S. roxburghii

Binomial name
- Serruria roxburghii R.Br.

Species of plant

Serruria roxburghii, the short-leaf spiderhead, is a flowering shrub that belongs to the genus Serruria and forms part of the fynbos. The plant is endemic to the Western Cape and occurs at Paarlberg, Paardeberg in Malmesbury, and Riebeek-Kasteel. The shrub grows to 1.0 m high and flowers from September to November.

The plant dies after a fire but the seeds survive. Two months after flowering, the fruit falls and ants disperse the seeds. They store the seeds in their nests. The plant is unisexual. Pollination takes place through the action of insects. The plant grows in sandy soil at elevations of 120 – 160 m.

== Sources ==
- REDLIST Sanbi
- Biodiversityexplorer
- Protea Atlas
- Plants of the World Online
