= Serruria candicans =

Conservation status
- Vulnerable (IUCN 3.1)

Scientific classification
- Kingdom: Plantae
- Clade: Tracheophytes
- Clade: Angiosperms
- Clade: Eudicots
- Order: Proteales
- Family: Proteaceae
- Genus: Serruria
- Species: S. candicans

Binomial name
- Serruria candicans R.Br.

Synonyms
- Nivenia candicans R.Br.

Species of flowering plant

Serruria candicans, the shiny spiderhead, is a flower-bearing shrub that belongs to the genus Serruria and forms part of the fynbos. The plant is native to the Western Cape, where it occurs from Elandskloof to the Slanghoek Mountains and Paardeberg at Malmesbury. The shrub is erect and grows only 80 cm tall and bears flowers from July to December.

Fire destroys the plant but the seeds survive. Two months after flowering, the fruit falls off and ants disperse the seeds. They store the seeds in their nests. The plant is unisexual. Pollination takes place through the action of insects. The plant grows in mountain fynbos and renosterveld at elevations of 60–700 m.
