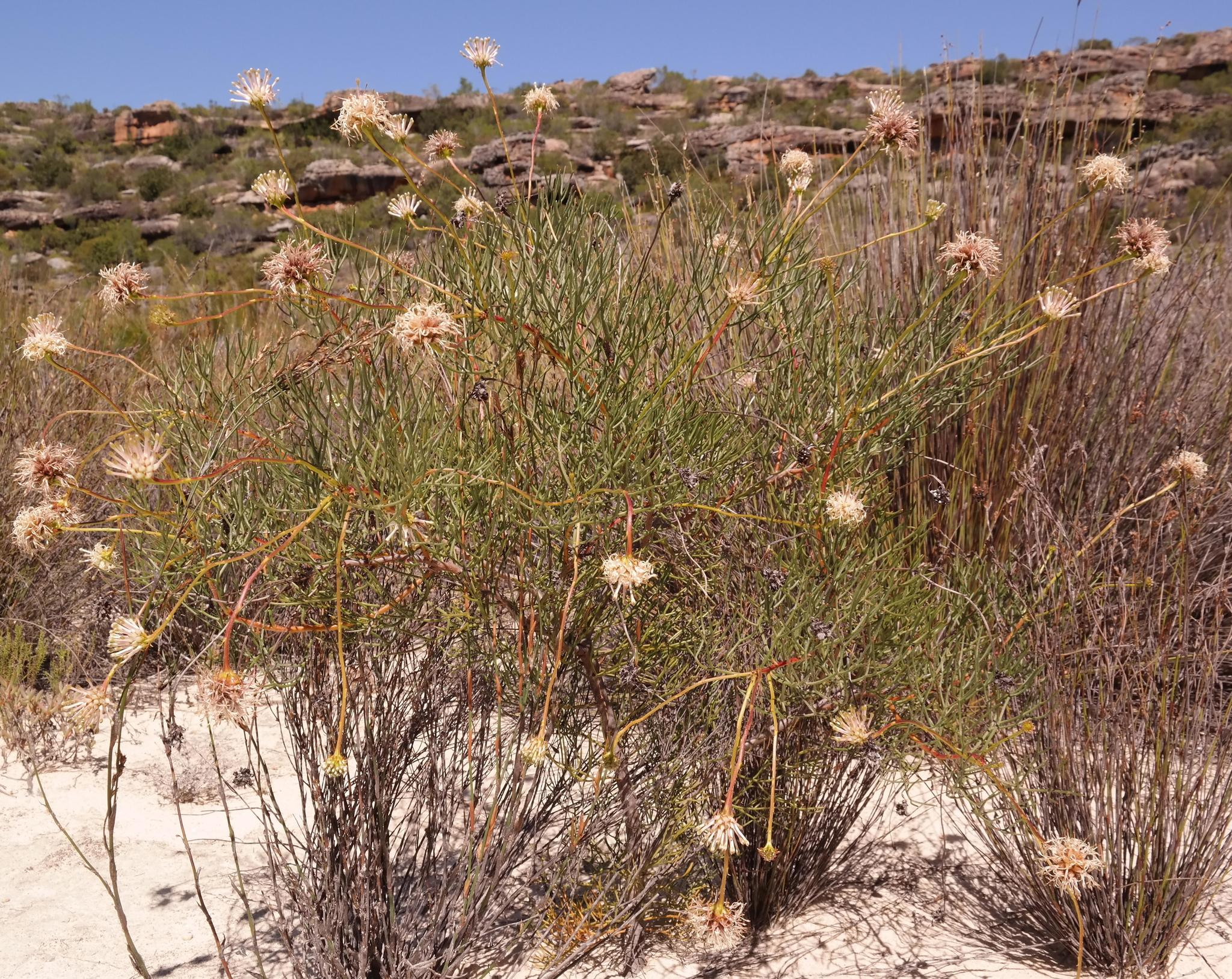

Conservation status
- Critically Endangered (IUCN 3.1)

Scientific classification
- Kingdom: Plantae
- Clade: Tracheophytes
- Clade: Angiosperms
- Clade: Eudicots
- Order: Proteales
- Family: Proteaceae
- Genus: Serruria
- Species: S. lacunosa

Binomial name
- Serruria lacunosa Rourke

= Serruria lacunosa =

Species of flowering plant

Serruria lacunosa, the Matsikamma spiderhead, is a flower-bearing shrub that belongs to the genus Serruria and forms part of the fynbos. The plant is native to the Western Cape and occurs on the Gifberg. The shrub grows up to 1.5 m tall and flowers from September to April.

Fire destroys the plant but the seeds survive. Two months after flowering, the fruit falls off and ants disperse the seeds. They store the seeds in their nests. The plant is unisexual and pollination takes place through the action of insects. The plant grows in sandstone soil at elevations of 700–800 m.

In Afrikaans it is known as Matzikamma-spinnekopbos.
