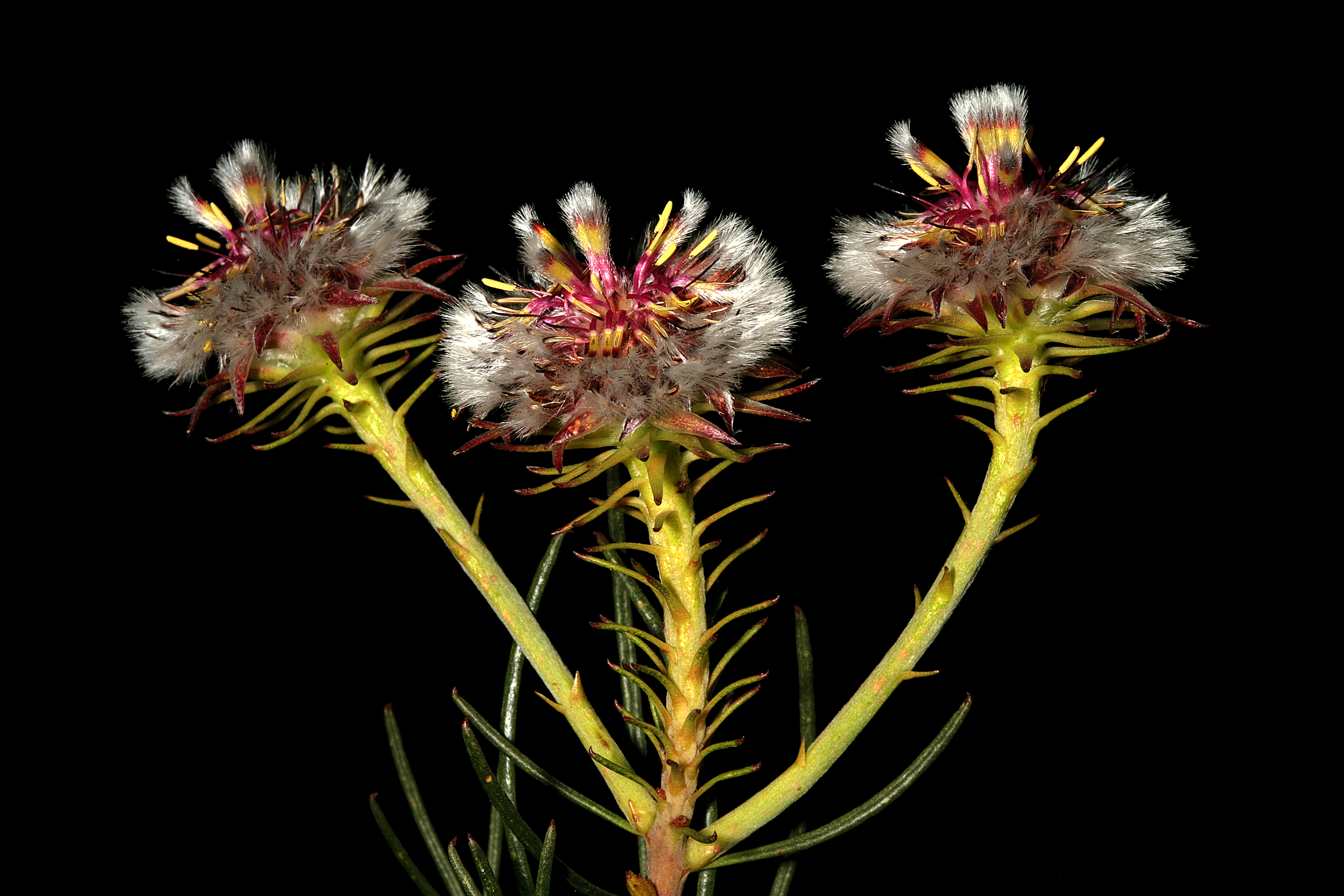

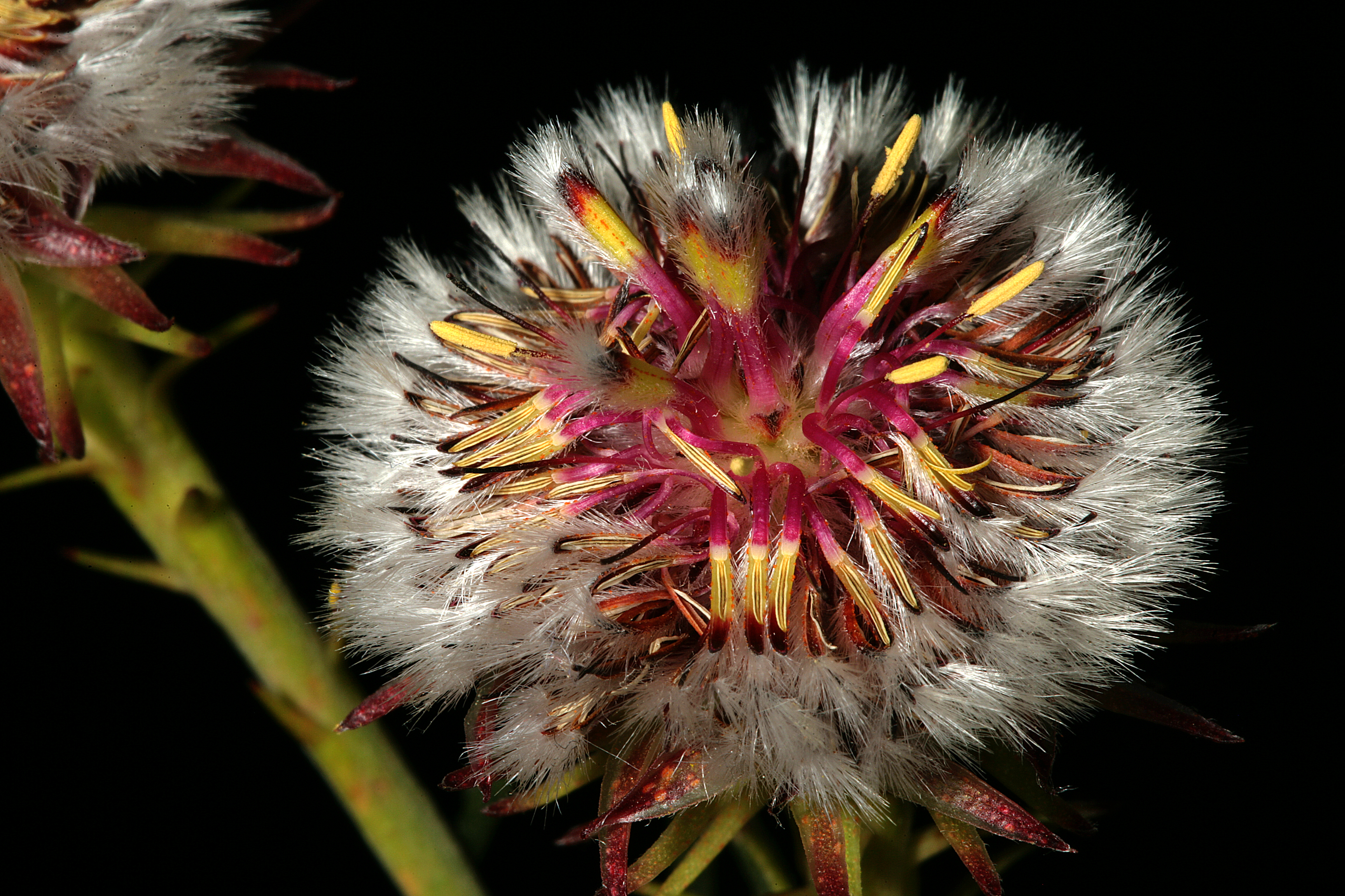

Conservation status
- Endangered (IUCN 3.1)

Scientific classification
- Kingdom: Plantae
- Clade: Tracheophytes
- Clade: Angiosperms
- Clade: Eudicots
- Order: Proteales
- Family: Proteaceae
- Genus: Serruria
- Species: S. heterophylla

Binomial name
- Serruria heterophylla Meisn.

= Serruria heterophylla =

Species of flowering plant

Serruria heterophylla, the spindly spiderhead, is a flower-bearing shrub that belongs to the genus Serruria and forms part of the fynbos. The plant is native to the Western Cape and occurs near Kleinmond and the Klein River Mountains. The shrub grows erect, grows 1.0 m tall and flowers from July to October.

The plant dies after a fire but the seeds survive. Two months after flowering, the fruit falls off and ants disperse the seeds. They store the seeds in their nests. The plant is unisexual. Pollination takes place through the action of insects . The plant grows in sandstone soil at heights of 90–310 m.

In Afrikaans it is known as speekbeinspinnekopbos.
