= Serruria flava =

Conservation status
- Critically Endangered (IUCN 3.1)

Scientific classification
- Kingdom: Plantae
- Clade: Tracheophytes
- Clade: Angiosperms
- Clade: Eudicots
- Order: Proteales
- Family: Proteaceae
- Genus: Serruria
- Species: S. flava

Binomial name
- Serruria flava Meisn.

Species of plant

Serruria flava, the Wupperthal spiderhead, is a flowering shrub that belongs to the genus Serruria and forms part of the fynbos. The plant, which is critically endangered, is endemic to the Western Cape and in the northern Cederberg near Wupperthal. The shrub blooms from August to October.

== Sources ==
- REDLIST Sanbi
- Biodiversityexplorer
- iNaturalist
- Plants of the World Online
