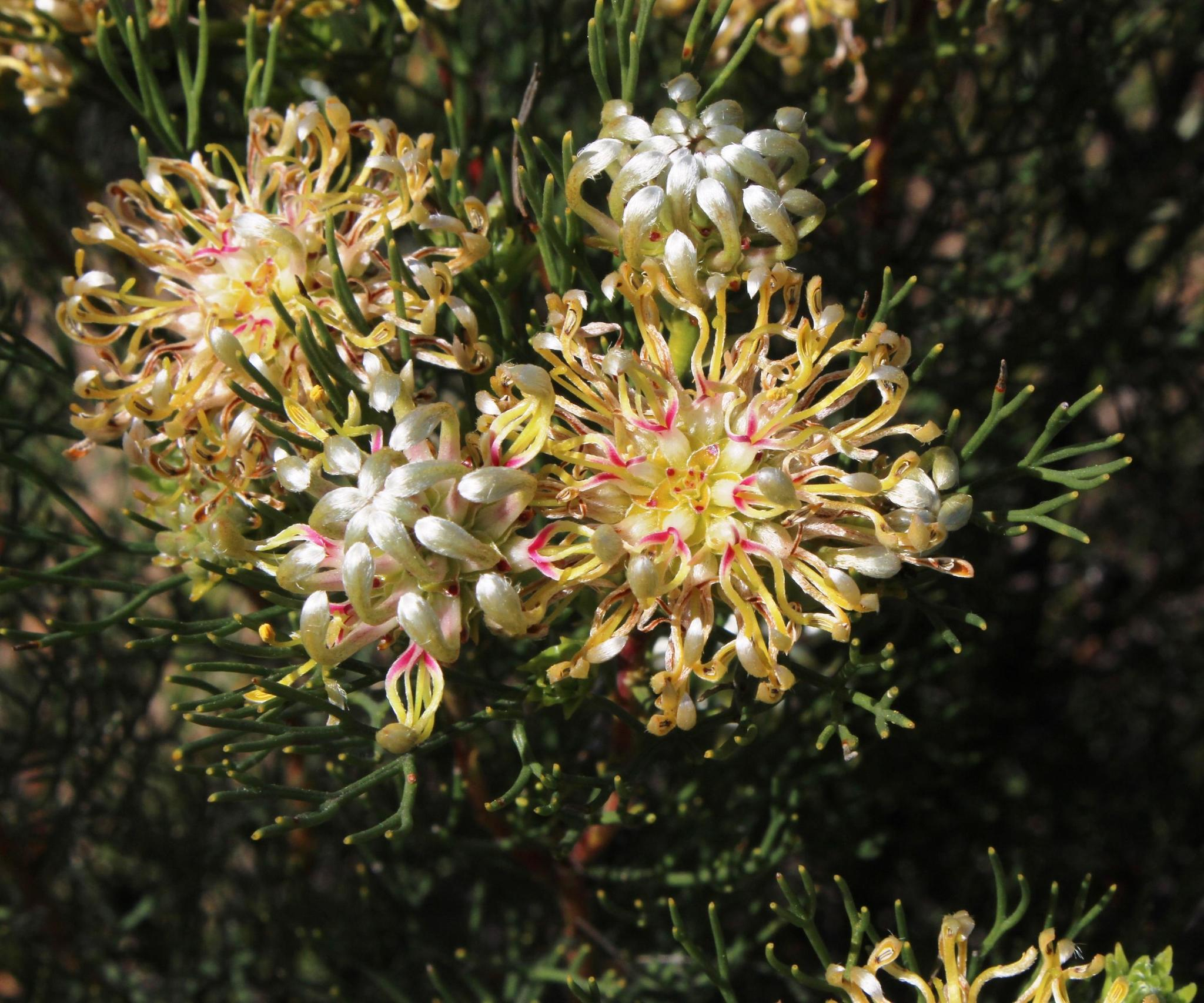

Conservation status
- Least Concern (IUCN 3.1)

Scientific classification
- Kingdom: Plantae
- Clade: Tracheophytes
- Clade: Angiosperms
- Clade: Eudicots
- Order: Proteales
- Family: Proteaceae
- Genus: Serruria
- Species: S. acrocarpa

Binomial name
- Serruria acrocarpa R.Br.

= Serruria acrocarpa =

Species of plant

Serruria acrocarpa, the common rootstock spiderhead, is a flower-bearing shrub that belongs to the genus Serruria. The plant is native to the Western Cape and occurs from the Cederberg to the Southern Cape. The shrub grows to 50 cm in length and flowers in spring. The plant sprouts again after it has burned. The plant grows on plains and lower slopes of fynbos vegetation.

In Afrikaans it is known as hawekwas-spinnekopbos.

== Gallery ==
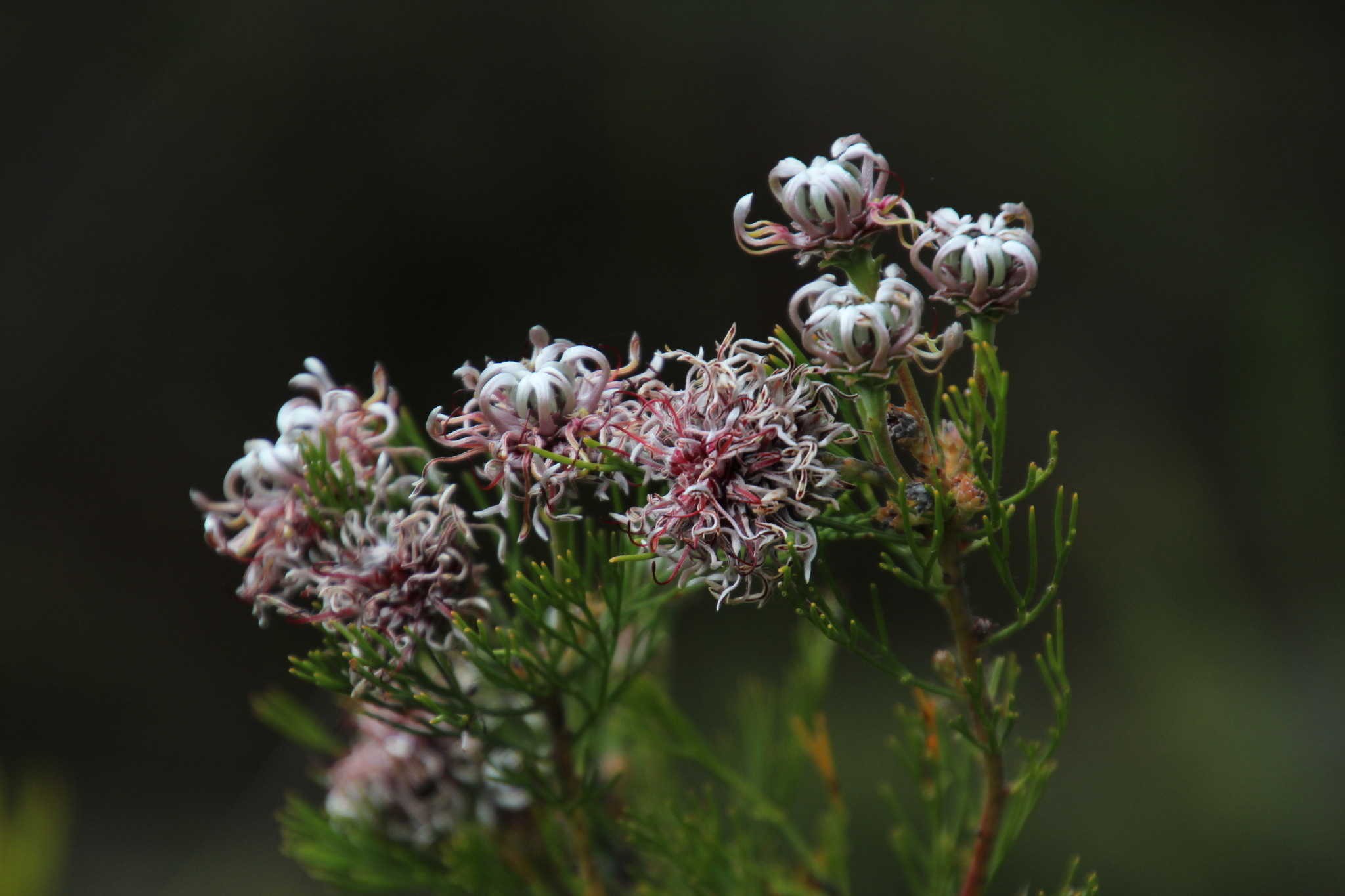

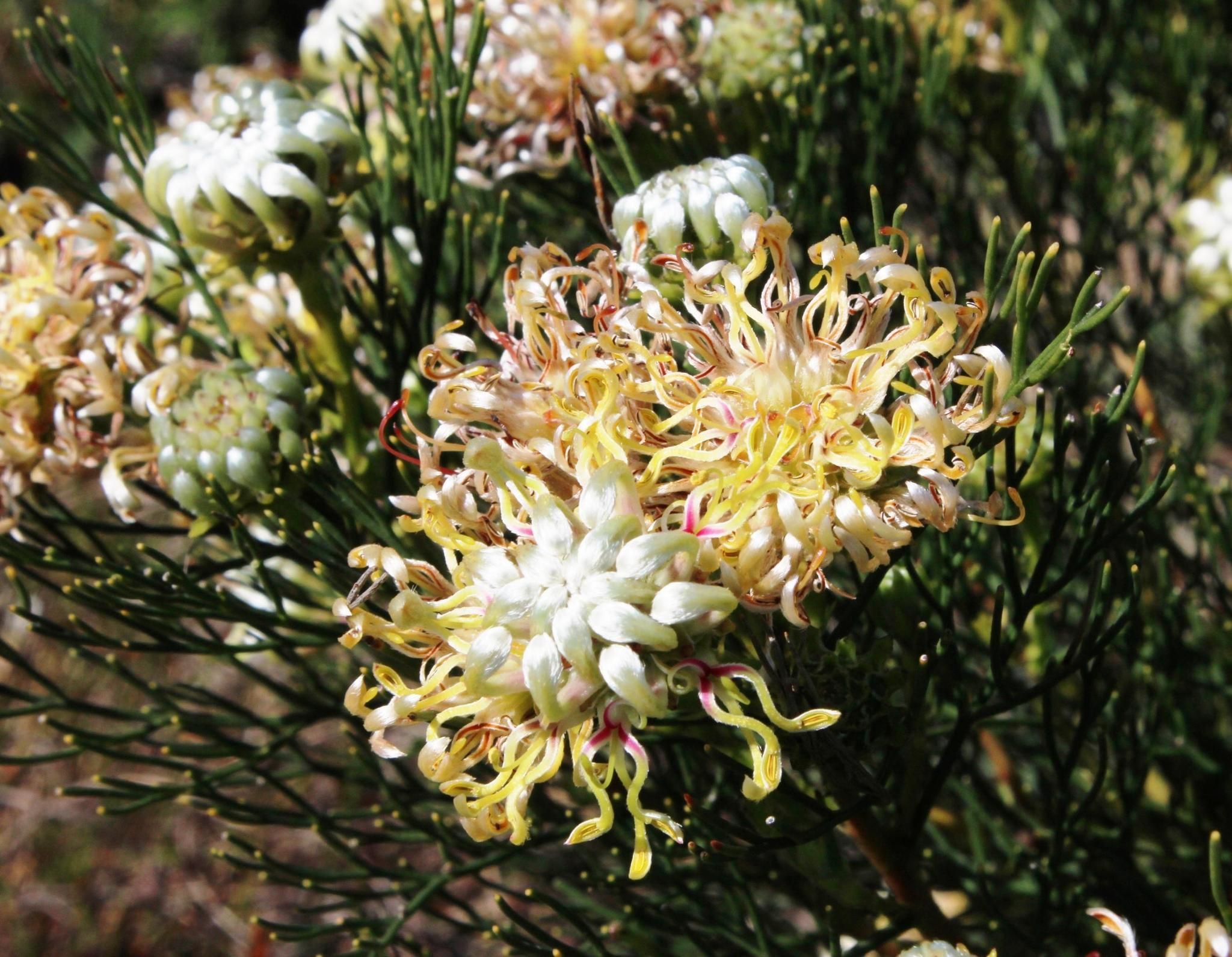

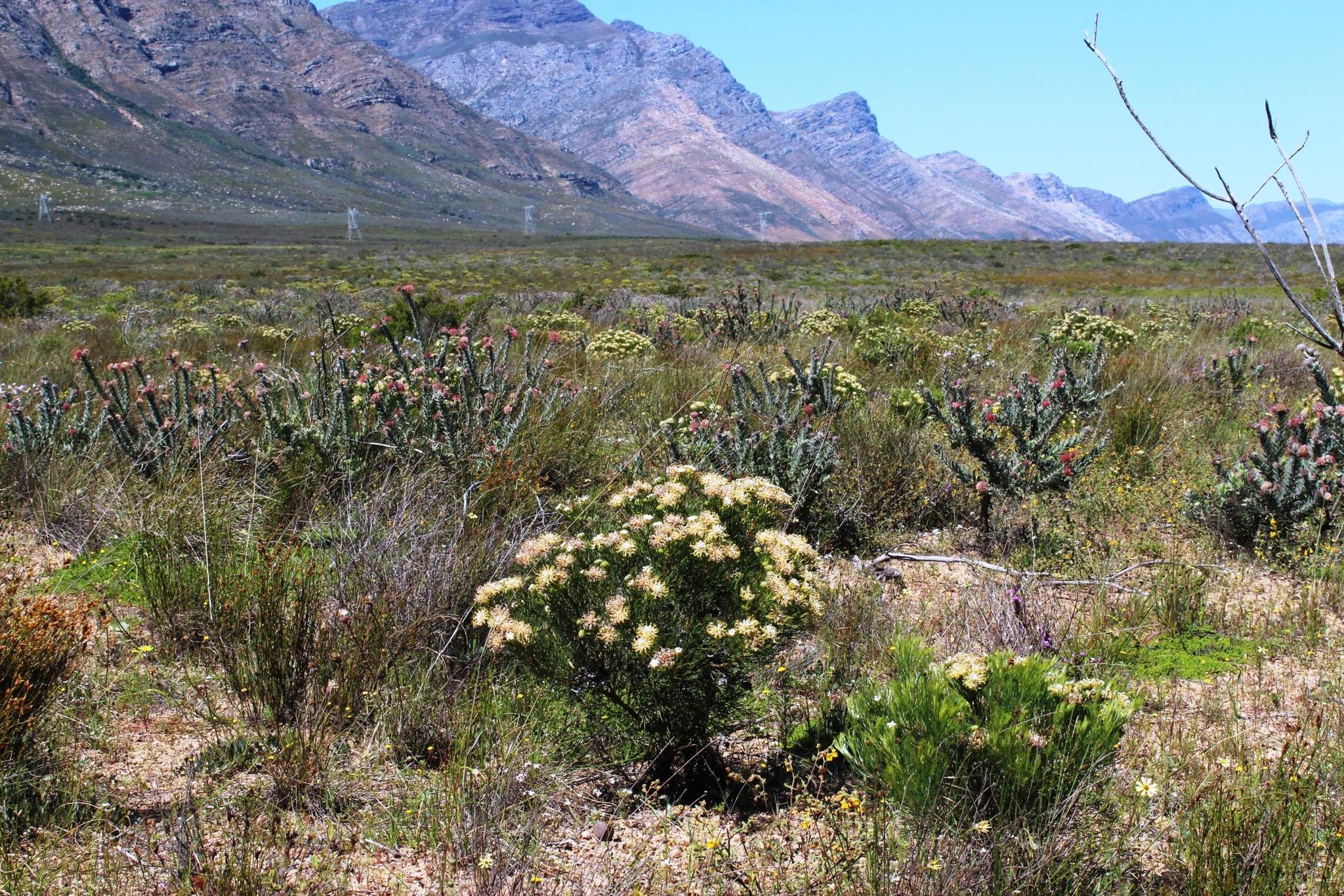

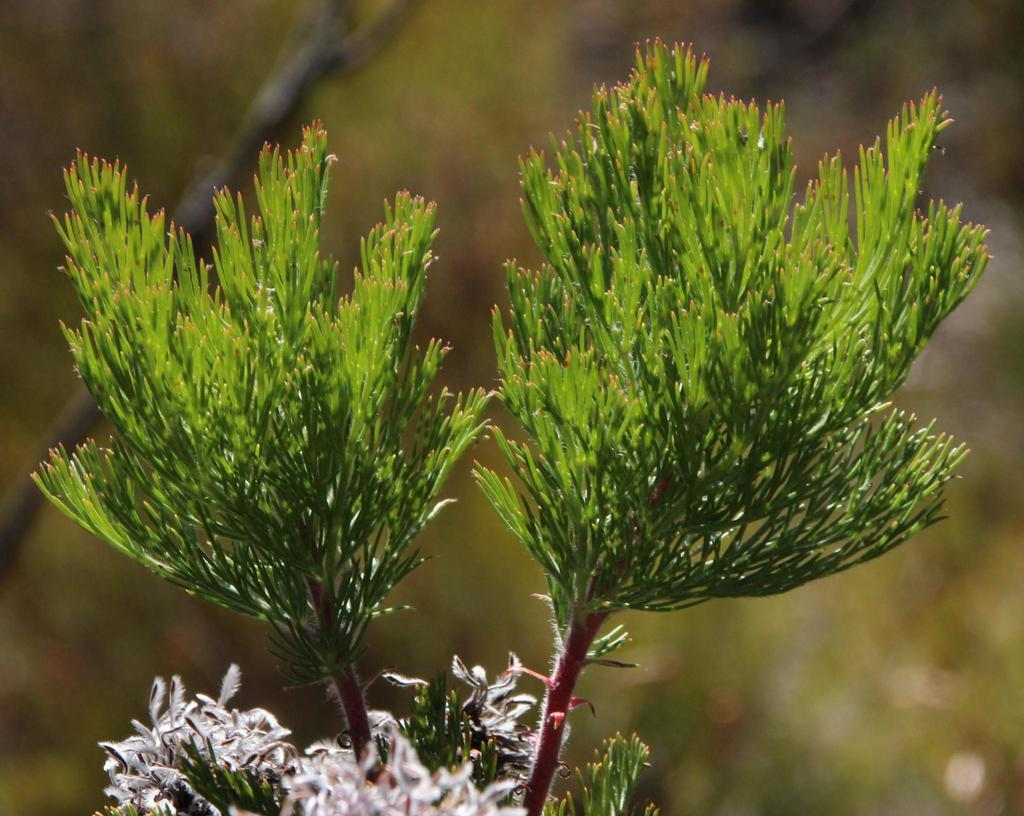

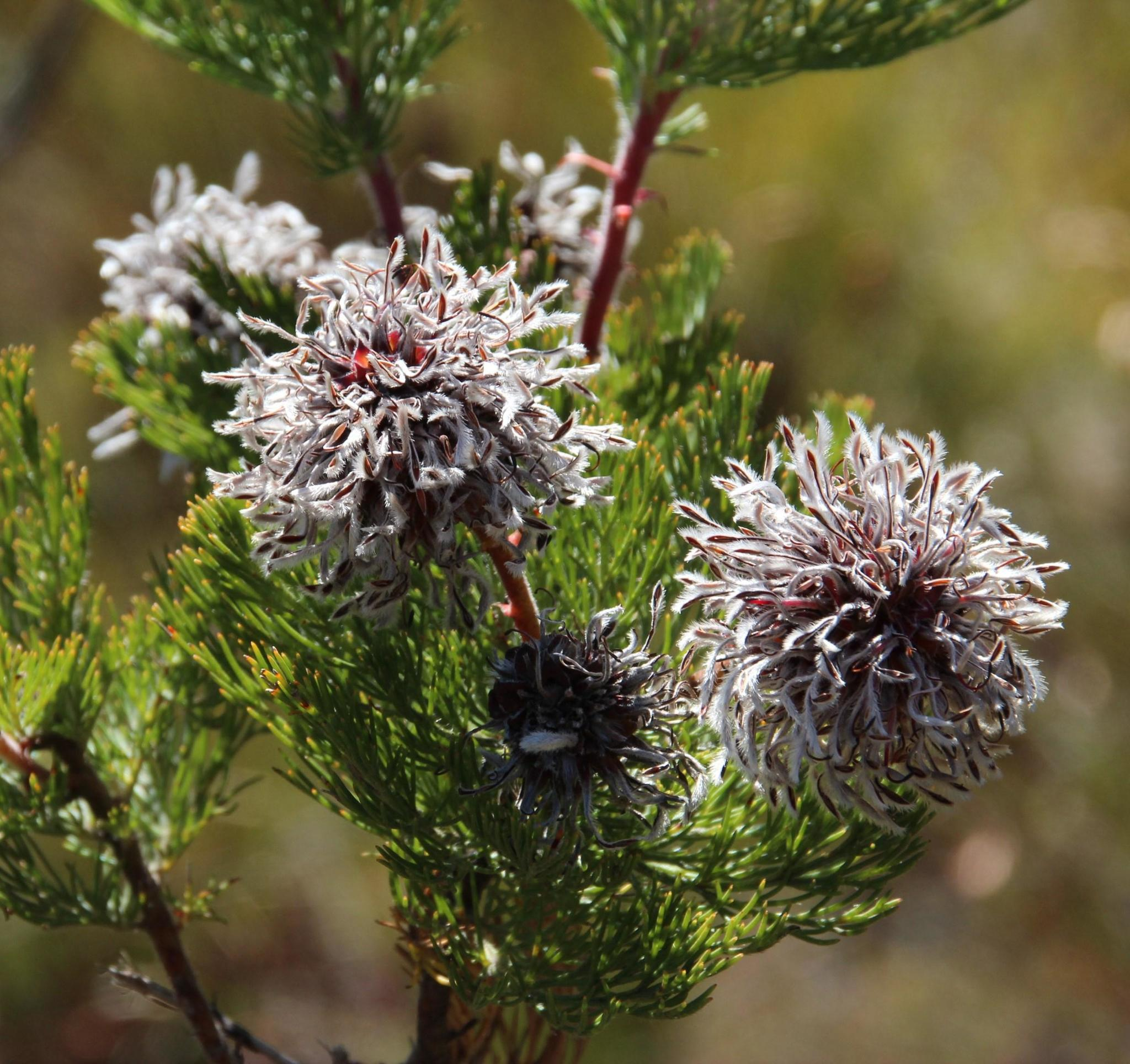

== Sources ==
- Threatened Species Programme | SANBI Red List of South African Plants
- Serruria acrocarpa (Common rootstock spiderhead)
- Serruria acrocarpa
