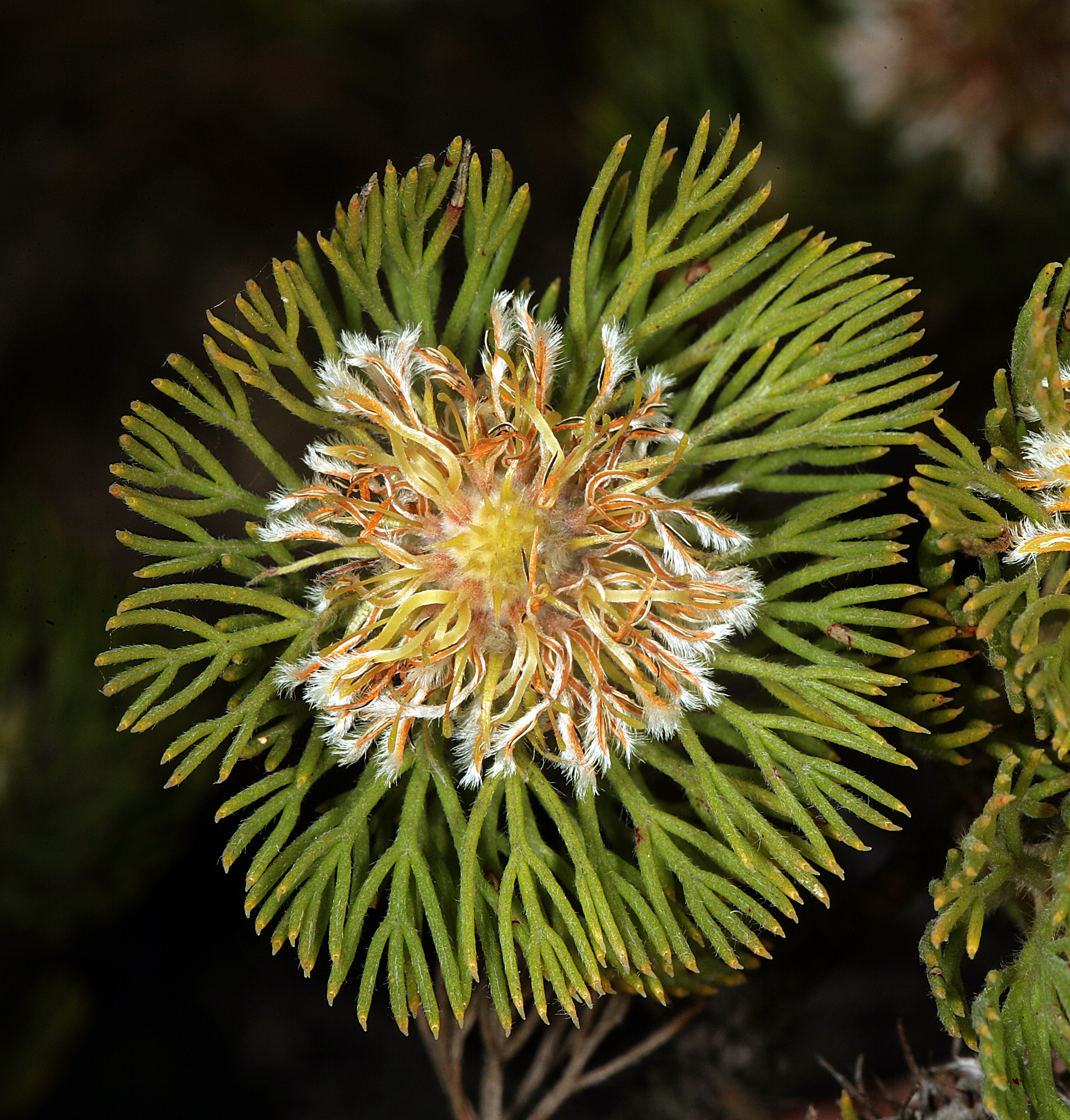

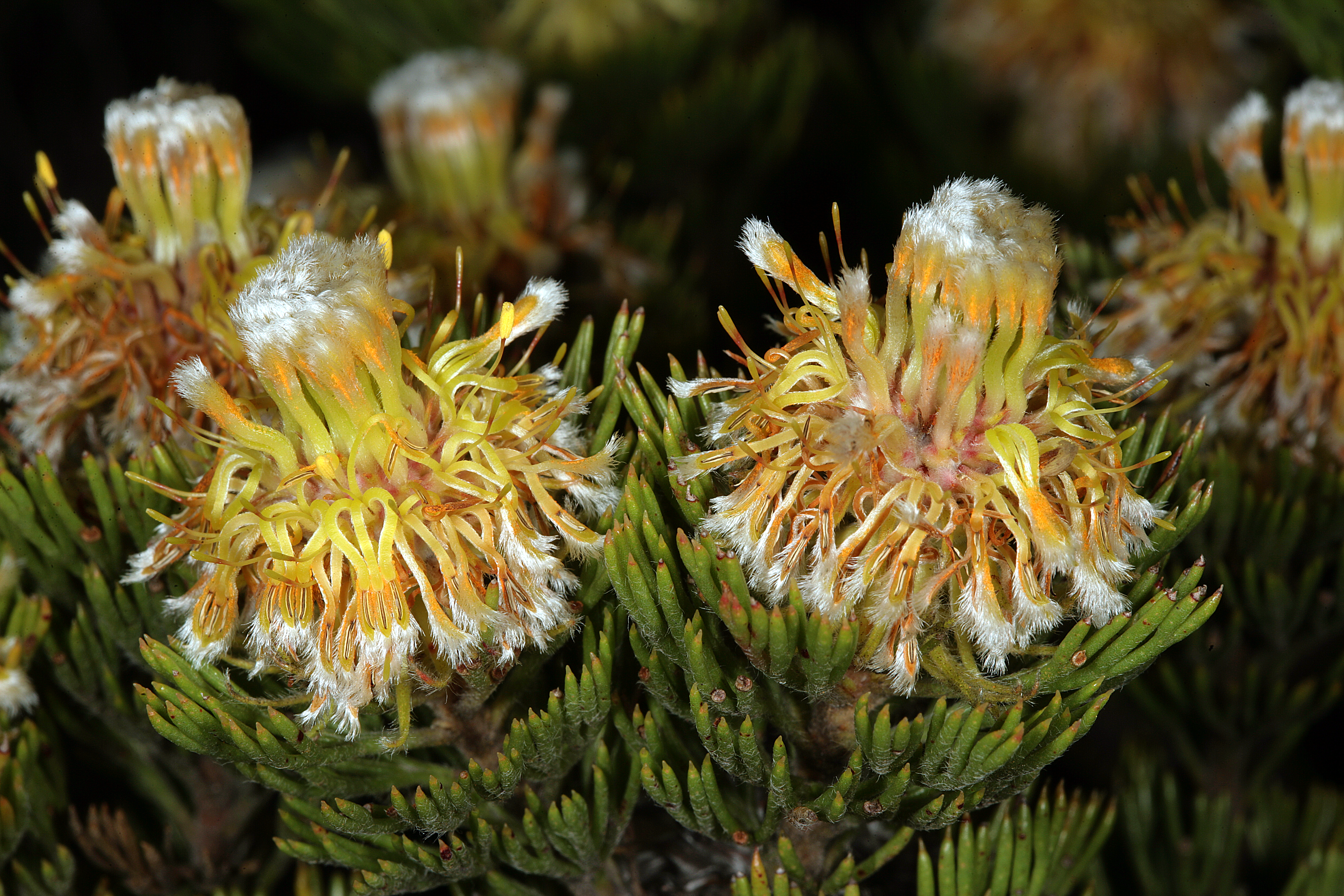

Conservation status
- Least Concern (IUCN 3.1)

Scientific classification
- Kingdom: Plantae
- Clade: Tracheophytes
- Clade: Angiosperms
- Clade: Eudicots
- Order: Proteales
- Family: Proteaceae
- Genus: Serruria
- Species: S. villosa

Binomial name
- Serruria villosa (Lam.) R.Br.

Synonyms
- Protea villosa Lam.; Serruria vallaris Knight

= Serruria villosa =

Species of flowering plant

Serruria villosa, the golden spiderhead, is a flower-bearing shrub that belongs to the genus Serruria and forms part of the fynbos. The plant is native to the Western Cape, where it occurs only on the Cape Peninsula and just south of Constantia. The shrub is erect and grows only 50 cm tall and bears flowers from April to July.

Fire destroys the plant but the seeds survive. Two months after flowering, the fruit falls off and ants disperse the seeds. They store the seeds in their nests. The plant is bisexual. Pollination takes place through the action of insects. The plant grows in sandy soil at elevations of 0–350 m.

In Afrikaans it is known as gouespinnekopbos.
