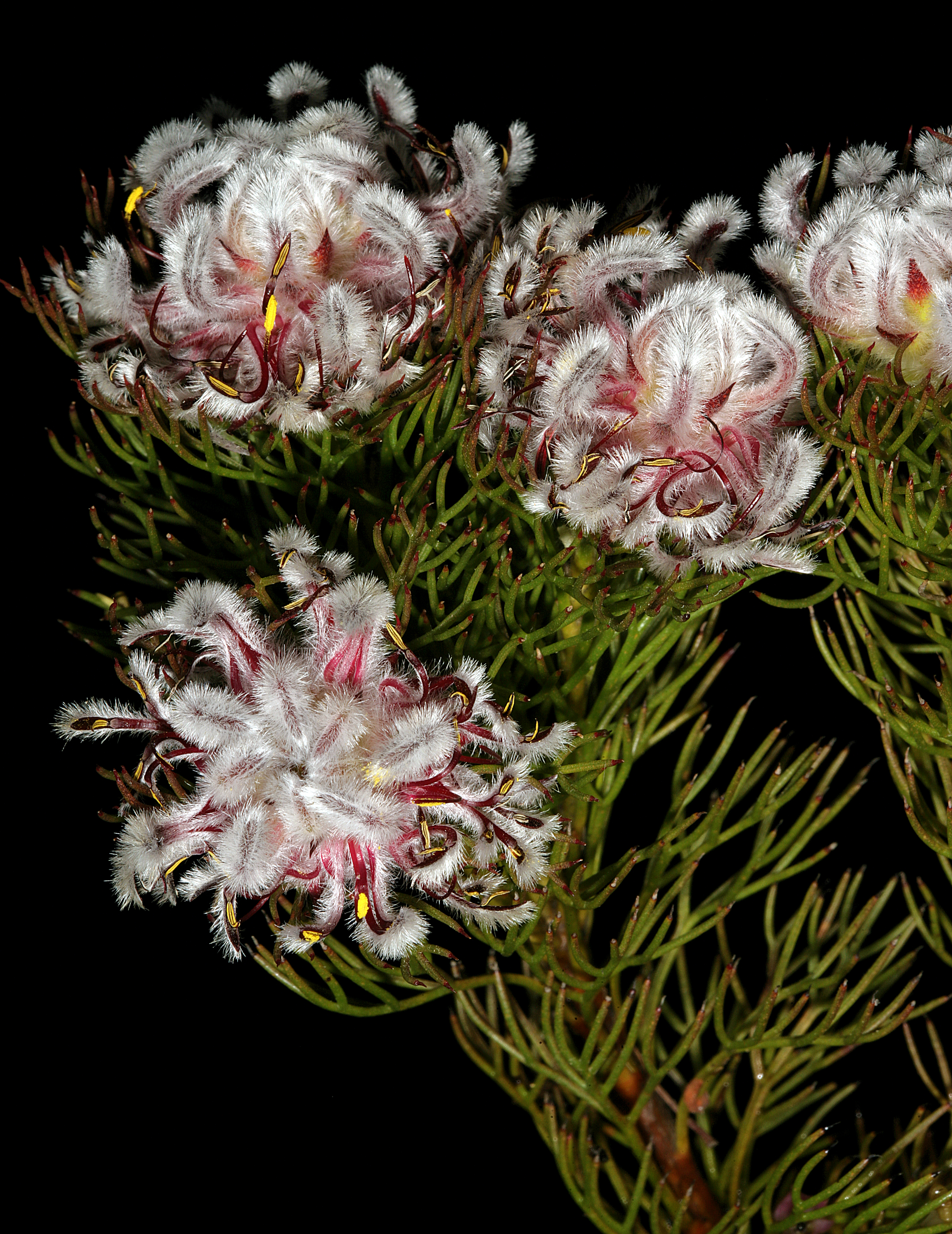

Conservation status
- Vulnerable (IUCN 3.1)

Scientific classification
- Kingdom: Plantae
- Clade: Tracheophytes
- Clade: Angiosperms
- Clade: Eudicots
- Order: Proteales
- Family: Proteaceae
- Genus: Serruria
- Species: S. rostellaris

Binomial name
- Serruria rostellaris Salisb. ex Knight, (1809)

= Serruria rostellaris =

Species of plant

Serruria rostellaris, the remote spiderhead, is a flowering shrub that belongs to the genus Serruria and forms part of the fynbos. The plant is endemic to the Western Cape and occurs from Grabouw to Hermanus, Groenlandberg, Caledon, Swartberg, and Kleinrivierberge.

== Sources ==
- REDLIST Sanbi
- Protea Atlas
- iNaturalist
- Plants of the World Online
