= Serruria decumbens =

Conservation status
- Endangered (IUCN 3.1)

Scientific classification
- Kingdom: Plantae
- Clade: Tracheophytes
- Clade: Angiosperms
- Clade: Eudicots
- Order: Proteales
- Family: Proteaceae
- Genus: Serruria
- Species: S. decumbens

Binomial name
- Serruria decumbens (Thunb.)

Species of plant

Serruria decumbensis, the peninsula spiderhead, a flowering shrub that belongs to the genus Serruria and forms part of the fynbos. The plant is endemic to the Western Cape and occurs in the Cape Peninsula from Kommetjie to Gifkommetjie. The shrub is flat but grows 1.0 m high and flowers from July to October

Fire destroys the plant but the seeds survive. Two months after flowering, the fruit falls and ants disperse the seeds. They store the seeds in their nests. The plant is unisexual. Pollination takes place through the action of insects. The plant grows in sandstone soil in rocky areas at altitudes of 150 – 310 m.

== Sources ==
- REDLIST Sanbi
- Biodiversityexplorer
- Protea Atlas
- Plants of the World Online
