= Serruria rubricaulis =

Conservation status
- Near Threatened (IUCN 3.1)

Scientific classification
- Kingdom: Plantae
- Clade: Tracheophytes
- Clade: Angiosperms
- Clade: Eudicots
- Order: Proteales
- Family: Proteaceae
- Genus: Serruria
- Species: S. rubricaulis

Binomial name
- Serruria rubricaulis R.Br. (1810)

Species of plant

Serruria rubricaulis, the red-stem spiderhead, is a flowering shrub that belongs to the genus Serruria and forms part of the fynbos. The plant is endemic to the Western Cape and occurs from the Kleinrivierberge to the Elim plain and seaward. The shrub is small, upright and grows only 30 cm tall and flowers from July to November.

The plant sprouts again after a fire. Two months after flowering, the fruit falls and ants disperse the seeds. They store the seeds in their nests. The plant is unisexual. Pollination takes place through the action of insects. The plant grows in clay and acid soil at elevations of 20 – 100 m.

== Sources ==
- REDLIST Sanbi
- Biodiversityexplorer
- Protea Atlas
- Plants of the World Online
