= Serruria cygnea =

Conservation status
- Least Concern (IUCN 3.1)

Scientific classification
- Kingdom: Plantae
- Clade: Tracheophytes
- Clade: Angiosperms
- Clade: Eudicots
- Order: Proteales
- Family: Proteaceae
- Genus: Serruria
- Species: S. cygnea

Binomial name
- Serruria cygnea R.Br.

Species of flowering plant

Serruria cygnea, the swan spiderbush, is a flowering shrub that belongs to the genus Serruria and forms part of the fynbos. The plant is endemic to the Western Cape and occurs in the Sandveld, the Cederberg up to the Slanghoekberge and Hexrivierberge. The shrub grows up to 1.0 m tall and flowers from September to November.

The plant sprouts again after it burns. Two months after flowering, the fruit falls and ants disperse the seeds. They store the seeds in their nests. The plant is unisexual. Pollination takes place through the action of insects. The plant grows in sandstone and shale soil at elevations of 350 – 950 m.

== Sources ==
- REDLIST Sanbi
- Biodiversityexplorer
- Plants of the World Online
