= List of Proteales of South Africa =

Flowering plants in the order Proteales recorded from South Africa

Proteales is an order of flowering plants consisting of three (or four) families which has been recognized by almost all taxonomists. The representatives of the Proteales can be very different from each other – the order contains plants that do not look alike at all. What they have in common is seeds with little or no endosperm, and the ovules are often atropic. The anthophytes are a grouping of plant taxa bearing flower-like reproductive structures. They were formerly thought to be a clade comprising plants bearing flower-like structures. The group contained the angiosperms – the extant flowering plants, such as roses and grasses – as well as the Gnetales and the extinct Bennettitales.

23,420 species of vascular plant have been recorded in South Africa, making it the sixth most species-rich country in the world and the most species-rich country on the African continent. Of these, 153 species are considered to be threatened. Nine biomes have been described in South Africa: Fynbos, Succulent Karoo, desert, Nama Karoo, grassland, savanna, Albany thickets, the Indian Ocean coastal belt, and forests.

The 2018 South African National Biodiversity Institute's National Biodiversity Assessment plant checklist lists 35,130 taxa in the phyla Anthocerotophyta (hornworts (6)), Anthophyta (flowering plants (33534)), Bryophyta (mosses (685)), Cycadophyta (cycads (42)), Lycopodiophyta (Lycophytes(45)), Marchantiophyta (liverworts (376)), Pinophyta (conifers (33)), and Pteridophyta (cryptogams (408)).

Two families are represented in the literature. Listed taxa include species, subspecies, varieties, and forms as recorded, some of which have subsequently been allocated to other taxa as synonyms, in which cases the accepted taxon is appended to the listing. Multiple entries under alternative names reflect taxonomic revision over time.

== Platanaceae ==
Family: Platanaceae,

=== Platanus ===
Genus Platanus:

- Platanus × hispanica Mill. ex Münchh. not indigenous, cultivated, naturalised

== Proteaceae ==
Family: Proteaceae,

=== Aulax ===
Genus Aulax:

- Aulax cancellata (L.) Druce, endemic
- Aulax cneorifolia Salisb. ex Knight, accepted as Aulax umbellata (Thunb.) R.Br. indigenous
- Aulax pallasia Stapf, endemic
- Aulax pinifolia P.J.Bergius, accepted as Aulax cancellata (L.) Druce, indigenous
- Aulax umbellata (Thunb.) R.Br. endemic

=== Banksia ===
Genus Banksia:

- Banksia coccinea R.Br. not indigenous, cultivated, naturalised
- Banksia ericifolia L.f. not indigenous, cultivated, naturalised, invasive
  - Banksia ericifolia L.f. subsp. ericifolia, not indigenous, cultivated, naturalised, invasive
- Banksia formosa (R.Br.) A.R.Mast & K.R.Thiele, not indigenous, cultivated, naturalised
- Banksia integrifolia L.f. not indigenous, cultivated, naturalised, invasive
- Banksia serrata L.f. not indigenous, cultivated, naturalised, invasive
- Banksia speciosa R.Br. not indigenous, cultivated, naturalised, invasive

=== Brabejum ===
Genus Brabejum:

- Brabejum stellatifolium L. endemic

=== Diastella ===
Genus Diastella:

- Diastella bryiflora Salisb. ex Knight, accepted as Diastella thymelaeoides (P.J.Bergius) Rourke subsp. thymelaeoides, indigenous
- Diastella buekii (Gand.) Rourke, endemic
- Diastella divaricata (P.J.Bergius) Rourke, indigenous
  - Diastella divaricata (P.J.Bergius) Rourke subsp. divaricata, endemic
  - Diastella divaricata (P.J.Bergius) Rourke subsp. montana Rourke, endemic
- Diastella ericaefolia Salisb. ex Knight, accepted as Diastella proteoides (L.) Druce, indigenous
- Diastella fraterna Rourke, endemic
- Diastella myrtifolia (Thunb.) Salisb. ex Knight, endemic
- Diastella parilis Salisb. ex Knight, endemic
- Diastella proteoides (L.) Druce, endemic
- Diastella serpyllifolia Salisb. ex Knight, accepted as Diastella divaricata (P.J.Bergius) Rourke subsp. montana Rourke, indigenous
- Diastella thymelaeoides (P.J.Bergius) Rourke, endemic
  - Diastella thymelaeoides (P.J.Bergius) Rourke subsp. meridiana Rourke, endemic
  - Diastella thymelaeoides (P.J.Bergius) Rourke subsp. thymelaeoides, endemic

=== Dryandra ===
Genus Dryandra:

- Dryandra formosa R.Br. accepted as Banksia formosa (R.Br.) A.R.Mast & K.R.Thiele, not indigenous, cultivated, naturalised

=== Faurea ===
Genus Faurea:

- Faurea decipiens C.H.Wright, accepted as Faurea rochetiana (A.Rich.) Chiov. ex Pic.Serm. indigenous
- Faurea galpinii E.Phillips, endemic
- Faurea macnaughtonii E.Phillips, indigenous
- Faurea natalensis E.Phillips, accepted as Faurea macnaughtonii E.Phillips, indigenous
- Faurea recondita Rourke & V.R.Clark, endemic
- Faurea rochetiana (A.Rich.) Chiov. ex Pic.Serm. indigenous
  - Faurea rochetiana (A.Rich.) Chiov. ex Pic.Serm. subsp. speciosa (Welw.) Troupin, accepted as Faurea rochetiana (A.Rich.) Chiov. ex Pic.Serm. indigenous
- Faurea saligna Harv. indigenous
  - Faurea saligna Harv. subsp. xanthoneura Merxm. accepted as Faurea saligna Harv. indigenous
- Faurea speciosa Welw. accepted as Faurea rochetiana (A.Rich.) Chiov. ex Pic.Serm. indigenous
  - Faurea speciosa Welw. var. lanuginosa Hiern, accepted as Faurea rochetiana (A.Rich.) Chiov. ex Pic.Serm. indigenous

=== Grevillea ===
Genus Grevillea:

- Grevillea banksii R.Br. not indigenous, cultivated, naturalised, invasive
- Grevillea robusta A.Cunn. ex R.Br. not indigenous, cultivated, naturalised, invasive
- Grevillea rosmarinifolia A.Cunn. not indigenous, cultivated, naturalised, invasive

=== Hakea ===
Genus Hakea:

- Hakea acicularis (Vent.) Salisb. ex Knight, accepted as Hakea sericea Schrad. & J.C.Wendl. not indigenous, naturalised
- Hakea drupacea (C.F.Gaertn.) Roem. & Schult. not indigenous, naturalised, invasive
- Hakea gibbosa (Sm.) Cav. not indigenous, naturalised, invasive
- Hakea salicifolia (Vent.) B.L.Burtt, not indigenous, naturalised, invasive
- Hakea sericea Schrad. & J.C.Wendl. not indigenous, naturalised, invasive
- Hakea suaveolens R.Br. accepted as Hakea drupacea (C.F.Gaertn.) Roem. & Schult. not indigenous, naturalised
- Hakea victoria Drumm. not indigenous, cultivated, naturalised

=== Leucadendron ===
Genus Leucadendron:

- Leucadendron album (Thunb.) Fourc. endemic
- Leucadendron arcuatum (Lam.) I.Williams, endemic
- Leucadendron argenteum (L.) R.Br. endemic
- Leucadendron barkerae I.Williams, endemic
- Leucadendron bonum I.Williams, endemic
- Leucadendron brunioides Meisn. indigenous
  - Leucadendron brunioides Meisn. var. brunioides, endemic
  - Leucadendron brunioides Meisn. var. flumenlupinum I.Williams, endemic
- Leucadendron burchellii I.Williams, endemic
- Leucadendron cadens I.Williams, endemic
- Leucadendron chamelaea (Lam.) I.Williams, endemic
- Leucadendron cinereum (Sol. ex Aiton) R.Br. endemic
- Leucadendron comosum (Thunb.) R.Br. indigenous
  - Leucadendron comosum (Thunb.) R.Br. subsp. comosum, endemic
  - Leucadendron comosum (Thunb.) R.Br. subsp. homaeophyllum (Meisn.) I.Williams, endemic
- Leucadendron concavum I.Williams, endemic
- Leucadendron conicum (Lam.) I.Williams, endemic
- Leucadendron coniferum (L.) Meisn. endemic
- Leucadendron cordatum E.Phillips, endemic
- Leucadendron coriaceum E.Phillips & Hutch. endemic
- Leucadendron corymbosum P.J.Bergius, endemic
- Leucadendron cryptocephalum Guthrie, endemic
- Leucadendron daphnoides (Thunb.) Meisn. endemic
- Leucadendron diemontianum I.Williams, endemic
- Leucadendron discolor E.Phillips & Hutch. endemic
- Leucadendron dregei E.Mey. ex Meisn. endemic
- Leucadendron dubium (H.Buek ex Meisn.) E.Phillips & Hutch. endemic
- Leucadendron elimense E.Phillips, indigenous
  - Leucadendron elimense E.Phillips subsp. elimense, endemic
  - Leucadendron elimense E.Phillips subsp. salteri I.Williams, endemic
  - Leucadendron elimense E.Phillips subsp. vyeboomense I.Williams, endemic
- Leucadendron ericifolium R.Br. endemic
- Leucadendron eucalyptifolium H.Buek ex Meisn. endemic
- Leucadendron flexuosum I.Williams, endemic
- Leucadendron floridum R.Br. endemic
- Leucadendron foedum I.Williams, endemic
- Leucadendron galpinii E.Phillips & Hutch. endemic
- Leucadendron gandogeri Schinz ex Gand. endemic
- Leucadendron glaberrimum (Schltr.) Compton, indigenous
  - Leucadendron glaberrimum (Schltr.) Compton subsp. erubescens I.Williams, endemic
  - Leucadendron glaberrimum (Schltr.) Compton subsp. glaberrimum, endemic
- Leucadendron globosum (Kenn. ex Andrews) I.Williams, endemic
- Leucadendron grandiflorum (Salisb.) R.Br. endemic
- Leucadendron gydoense I.Williams, endemic
- Leucadendron immoderatum Rourke, endemic
- Leucadendron lanigerum H.Buek ex Meisn. indigenous
  - Leucadendron lanigerum H.Buek ex Meisn. var. laevigatum Meisn. endemic
  - Leucadendron lanigerum H.Buek ex Meisn. var. lanigerum, endemic
- Leucadendron laureolum (Lam.) Fourc. endemic
- Leucadendron laxum I.Williams, endemic
- Leucadendron levisanus (L.) P.J.Bergius, endemic
- Leucadendron linifolium (Jacq.) R.Br. endemic
- Leucadendron loeriense I.Williams, endemic
- Leucadendron loranthifolium (Salisb. ex Knight) I.Williams, endemic
- Leucadendron macowanii E.Phillips, endemic
- Leucadendron meridianum I.Williams, endemic
- Leucadendron meyerianum H.Buek ex E.Phillips & Hutch. endemic
- Leucadendron microcephalum (Gand.) Gand. & Schinz, endemic
- Leucadendron modestum I.Williams, endemic
- Leucadendron muirii E.Phillips, endemic
- Leucadendron nervosum E.Phillips & Hutch. endemic
- Leucadendron nitidum H.Buek ex Meisn. endemic
- Leucadendron nobile I.Williams, endemic
- Leucadendron olens I.Williams, endemic
- Leucadendron orientale I.Williams, endemic
- Leucadendron osbornei Rourke, endemic
- Leucadendron platyspermum R.Br. endemic
- Leucadendron pondoense A.E.van Wyk, endemic
- Leucadendron procerum (Salisb. ex Knight) I.Williams, endemic
- Leucadendron pubescens R.Br. endemic
- Leucadendron pubibracteolatum I.Williams, endemic
- Leucadendron radiatum E.Phillips & Hutch. endemic
- Leucadendron remotum I.Williams, endemic
- Leucadendron roodii E.Phillips, endemic
- Leucadendron rourkei I.Williams, endemic
- Leucadendron rubrum Burm.f. endemic
- Leucadendron salicifolium (Salisb.) I.Williams, endemic
- Leucadendron salignum P.J.Bergius, endemic
- Leucadendron sericeum (Thunb.) R.Br. endemic
- Leucadendron sessile R.Br. endemic
- Leucadendron sheilae I.Williams, endemic
- Leucadendron singulare I.Williams, endemic
- Leucadendron sorocephalodes E.Phillips & Hutch. endemic
- Leucadendron spirale (Salisb. ex Knight) I.Williams, endemic
- Leucadendron spissifolium (Salisb. ex Knight) I.Williams, indigenous
  - Leucadendron spissifolium (Salisb. ex Knight) I.Williams subsp. fragrans I.Williams, endemic
  - Leucadendron spissifolium (Salisb. ex Knight) I.Williams subsp. natalense (Thode & Gilg) I.Williams, endemic
  - Leucadendron spissifolium (Salisb. ex Knight) I.Williams subsp. oribinum I.Williams, endemic
  - Leucadendron spissifolium (Salisb. ex Knight) I.Williams subsp. phillipsii (Hutch.) I.Williams, endemic
  - Leucadendron spissifolium (Salisb. ex Knight) I.Williams subsp. spissifolium, endemic
- Leucadendron stellare (Sims) Sweet, endemic
- Leucadendron stelligerum I.Williams, endemic
- Leucadendron strobilinum (L.) Druce, endemic
- Leucadendron teretifolium (Andrews) I.Williams, endemic
- Leucadendron thymifolium (Salisb. ex Knight) I.Williams, endemic
- Leucadendron tinctum I.Williams, endemic
- Leucadendron tradouwense I.Williams, endemic
- Leucadendron uliginosum R.Br. indigenous
  - Leucadendron uliginosum R.Br. subsp. glabratum I.Williams, endemic
  - Leucadendron uliginosum R.Br. subsp. uliginosum, endemic
- Leucadendron verticillatum (Thunb.) Meisn. endemic
- Leucadendron xanthoconus (Kuntze) K.Schum. endemic

=== Leucospermum ===
Genus Leucospermum:

- Leucospermum alpinum (Salisb. ex Knight) Rourke, accepted as Vexatorella alpina (Salisb. ex Knight) Rourke, endemic
  - Leucospermum alpinum (Salisb. ex Knight) Rourke subsp. amoenum Rourke, accepted as Vexatorella amoena (Rourke) Rourke, endemic
- Leucospermum arenarium Rycroft, endemic
- Leucospermum bolusii Gand. endemic
- Leucospermum calligerum (Salisb. ex Knight) Rourke, endemic
- Leucospermum catherinae Compton, endemic
- Leucospermum conocarpodendron (L.) H.Buek, indigenous
  - Leucospermum conocarpodendron (L.) H.Buek subsp. conocarpodendron, endemic
  - Leucospermum conocarpodendron (L.) H.Buek subsp. viridum Rourke, endemic
- Leucospermum cordatum E.Phillips, endemic
- Leucospermum cordifolium (Salisb. ex Knight) Fourc. endemic
- Leucospermum cuneiforme (Burm.f.) Rourke, endemic
- Leucospermum erubescens Rourke, endemic
- Leucospermum formosum (Andrews) Sweet, endemic
- Leucospermum fulgens Rourke, endemic
- Leucospermum gerrardii Stapf, endemic
- Leucospermum glabrum E.Phillips, endemic
- Leucospermum gracile (Salisb. ex Knight) Rourke, endemic
- Leucospermum grandiflorum (Salisb.) R.Br. endemic
- Leucospermum gueinzii Meisn. endemic
- Leucospermum hamatum Rourke, endemic
- Leucospermum harpagonatum Rourke, endemic
- Leucospermum heterophyllum (Thunb.) Rourke, endemic
- Leucospermum hypophyllocarpodendron (L.) Druce, indigenous
  - Leucospermum hypophyllocarpodendron (L.) Druce subsp. canaliculatum (H.Buek ex Meisn.) Rourke, endemic
  - Leucospermum hypophyllocarpodendron (L.) Druce subsp. hypophyllocarpodendron, endemic
- Leucospermum innovans Rourke, endemic
- Leucospermum lineare R.Br. endemic
- Leucospermum muirii E.Phillips, endemic
- Leucospermum mundii Meisn. endemic
- Leucospermum obtusatum (Thunb.) E.Phillips, accepted as Vexatorella obtusata (Thunb.) Rourke, endemic
  - Leucospermum obtusatum (Thunb.) E.Phillips subsp. albomontanum Rourke, accepted as Vexatorella obtusata (Thunb.) Rourke subsp. albomontana (Rourke) Rourke, endemic
- Leucospermum oleifolium (P.J.Bergius) R.Br. endemic
- Leucospermum parile (Salisb. ex Knight) Sweet, endemic
- Leucospermum patersonii E.Phillips, endemic
- Leucospermum pedunculatum Klotzsch, endemic
- Leucospermum pluridens Rourke, endemic
- Leucospermum praecox Rourke, endemic
- Leucospermum praemorsum (Meisn.) E.Phillips, endemic
- Leucospermum profugum Rourke, endemic
- Leucospermum prostratum (Thunb.) Stapf, endemic
- Leucospermum reflexum H.Buek ex Meisn. indigenous
  - Leucospermum reflexum H.Buek ex Meisn. var. luteum Rourke, endemic
  - Leucospermum reflexum H.Buek ex Meisn. var. reflexum, endemic
- Leucospermum rochetianum A.Rich. accepted as Faurea rochetiana (A.Rich.) Chiov. ex Pic.Serm. indigenous
- Leucospermum rodolentum (Salisb. ex Knight) Rourke, endemic
- Leucospermum royenifolium (Salisb. ex Knight) Stapf, endemic
- Leucospermum saxatile (Salisb. ex Knight) Rourke, endemic
- Leucospermum saxosum S.Moore, indigenous
- Leucospermum secundifolium Rourke, endemic
- Leucospermum spathulatum R.Br. endemic
- Leucospermum tomentosum (Thunb.) R.Br. endemic
- Leucospermum tottum (L.) R.Br. indigenous
  - Leucospermum tottum (L.) R.Br. var. glabrum E.Phillips, endemic
  - Leucospermum tottum (L.) R.Br. var. tottum, endemic
- Leucospermum truncatulum (Salisb. ex Knight) Rourke, endemic
- Leucospermum truncatum (H.Buek ex Meisn.) Rourke, endemic
- Leucospermum utriculosum Rourke, endemic
- Leucospermum vestitum (Lam.) Rourke, endemic
- Leucospermum winteri Rourke, endemic
- Leucospermum wittebergense Compton, endemic

=== Macadamia ===
Genus Macadamia:

- Macadamia integrifolia Maiden & Betche, not indigenous, naturalised

=== Mimetes ===
Genus Mimetes:

- Mimetes arboreus Rourke, endemic
- Mimetes argenteus Salisb. ex Knight, endemic
- Mimetes capitulatus R.Br. endemic
- Mimetes chrysanthus Rourke, endemic
- Mimetes cucullatus (L.) R.Br. endemic
- Mimetes fimbriifolius Salisb. ex Knight, endemic
- Mimetes hirtus (L.) Salisb. ex Knight, endemic
- Mimetes hottentoticus E.Phillips & Hutch. endemic
- Mimetes palustris Salisb. ex Knight, endemic
- Mimetes pauciflorus R.Br. endemic
- Mimetes purpureus (L.) R.Br. accepted as Diastella proteoides (L.) Druce, indigenous
- Mimetes saxatilis E.Phillips, endemic
- Mimetes splendidus Salisb. ex Knight, endemic
- Mimetes stokoei E.Phillips & Hutch. endemic

=== Orothamnus ===
Genus Orothamnus:

- Orothamnus zeyheri Pappe ex Hook.f. endemic

=== Paranomus ===
Genus Paranomus:

- Paranomus abrotanifolius Salisb. ex Knight, endemic
- Paranomus adiantifolius Salisb. ex Knight, endemic
- Paranomus bolusii (Gand.) Levyns, endemic
- Paranomus bracteolaris Salisb. ex Knight, endemic
- Paranomus candicans (Thunb.) Kuntze, endemic
- Paranomus capitatus (R.Br.) Kuntze, endemic
- Paranomus centaureoides Levyns, endemic
- Paranomus concavus (Lam.) Kuntze, accepted as Diastella thymelaeoides (P.J.Bergius) Rourke subsp. thymelaeoides, indigenous
- Paranomus dispersus Levyns, endemic
- Paranomus dregei (H.Buek ex Meisn.) Kuntze, endemic
- Paranomus esterhuyseniae Levyns, endemic
- Paranomus lagopus (Thunb.) Salisb. endemic
- Paranomus longicaulis Salisb. ex Knight, endemic
- Paranomus reflexus (E.Phillips & Hutch.) Fourc. endemic
- Paranomus roodebergensis (Compton) Levyns, endemic
- Paranomus sceptrum-gustavianus (Sparrm.) Hyl. endemic
- Paranomus spathulatus (Thunb.) Kuntze, endemic
- Paranomus spicatus (P.J.Bergius) Kuntze, endemic
- Paranomus tomentosus (E.Phillips & Hutch.) N.E.Br. endemic

=== Protea ===
Genus Protea:

- Protea acaulos (L.) Reichard, endemic
- Protea acuminata Sims, endemic
- Protea amplexicaulis (Salisb.) R.Br. endemic
- Protea angustata R.Br. endemic
- Protea aristata E.Phillips, endemic
- Protea aspera E.Phillips, endemic
- Protea aurea (Burm.f.) Rourke, indigenous
  - Protea aurea (Burm.f.) Rourke subsp. aurea, endemic
  - Protea aurea (Burm.f.) Rourke subsp. potbergensis (Rourke) Rourke, endemic
- Protea burchellii Stapf, endemic
- Protea caespitosa Andrews, endemic
- Protea afra Meisn. indigenous
  - Protea afra Meisn. subsp. afra, indigenous
  - Protea afra Meisn. subsp. falcata (Beard) Lotter, endemic
- Protea canaliculata Andrews, endemic
- Protea compacta R.Br. endemic
- Protea comptonii Beard, indigenous
- Protea convexa E.Phillips, endemic
- Protea cordata Thunb. endemic
- Protea coronata Lam. endemic
- Protea cryophila Bolus, endemic
- Protea curvata N.E.Br. endemic
- Protea cynaroides (L.) L. endemic
- Protea decurrens E.Phillips, endemic
- Protea denticulata Rourke, endemic
- Protea dracomontana Beard, indigenous
- Protea effusa E.Mey. ex Meisn. endemic
- Protea eximia (Salisb. ex Knight) Fourc. endemic
- Protea foliosa Rourke, endemic
- Protea gaguedi J.F.Gmel. indigenous
- Protea glabra Thunb. endemic
- Protea grandiceps Tratt. endemic
- Protea holosericea (Salisb. ex Knight) Rourke, endemic
- Protea humiflora Andrews, endemic
- Protea inopina Rourke, endemic
- Protea intonsa Rourke, endemic
- Protea lacticolor Salisb. endemic
- Protea laetans L.E.Davidson, endemic
- Protea laevis R.Br. endemic
- Protea lanceolata E.Mey. ex Meisn. endemic
- Protea laurifolia Thunb. endemic
- Protea lepidocarpodendron (L.) L. endemic
- Protea longifolia Andrews, endemic
- Protea lorea R.Br. endemic
- Protea lorifolia (Salisb. ex Knight) Fourc. endemic
- Protea magnifica Link, endemic
- Protea montana E.Mey. ex Meisn. endemic
- Protea mucronifolia Salisb. endemic
- Protea mundii Klotzsch, endemic
- Protea namaquana Rourke, endemic
- Protea nana (P.J.Bergius) Thunb. endemic
- Protea neriifolia R.Br. endemic
- Protea nitida Mill. endemic
- Protea nubigena Rourke, endemic
- Protea obtusifolia H.Buek ex Meisn. endemic
- Protea odorata Thunb. endemic
- Protea parvula Beard, indigenous
- Protea pendula R.Br. endemic
- Protea piscina Rourke, endemic
- Protea pityphylla E.Phillips, endemic
  - Protea pityphylla E.Phillips var. latifolia E.Phillips, accepted as Protea hybrid, present
- Protea pruinosa Rourke, endemic
- Protea pudens Rourke, endemic
- Protea punctata Meisn. endemic
- Protea recondita H.Buek ex Meisn. endemic
- Protea repens (L.) L. endemic
- Protea restionifolia (Salisb. ex Knight) Rycroft, endemic
- Protea revoluta R.Br. endemic
- Protea roupelliae Meisn. indigenous
  - Protea roupelliae Meisn. subsp. hamiltonii Beard ex Rourke, endemic
  - Protea roupelliae Meisn. subsp. roupelliae, indigenous
- Protea rubropilosa Beard, endemic
- Protea rupicola Mund ex Meisn. endemic
- Protea scabra R.Br. endemic
- Protea scabriuscula E.Phillips, endemic
- Protea scolopendriifolia (Salisb. ex Knight) Rourke, endemic
- Protea scolymocephala (L.) Reichard, endemic
- Protea scorzonerifolia (Salisb. ex Knight) Rycroft, endemic
- Protea simplex E.Phillips, indigenous
- Protea speciosa (L.) L. endemic
- Protea stipitata E.Phillips, accepted as Protea afra Meisn. subsp. afra, present
- Protea stokoei E.Phillips, endemic
- Protea subulifolia (Salisb. ex Knight) Rourke, endemic
- Protea subvestita N.E.Br. indigenous
- Protea sulphurea E.Phillips, endemic
- Protea susannae E.Phillips, endemic
- Protea tenax (Salisb.) R.Br. endemic
- Protea venusta Compton, endemic
- Protea vogtsiae Rourke, endemic
- Protea welwitschii Engl. indigenous
  - Protea welwitschii Engl. subsp. glabrescens (Beard) Beard, accepted as Protea welwitschii Engl. indigenous
  - Protea welwitschii Engl. subsp. goetzeana (Engl.) Beard, accepted as Protea welwitschii Engl. indigenous
  - Protea welwitschii Engl. subsp. hirta Beard, accepted as Protea welwitschii Engl. present
  - Protea welwitschii Engl. var. glabrescens (Beard) Beard, accepted as Protea welwitschii Engl. indigenous
- Protea witzenbergiana E.Phillips, endemic

=== Serruria ===
Genus Serruria:

- Serruria acrocarpa R.Br. endemic
- Serruria adscendens (Lam.) R.Br. endemic
- Serruria aemula Salisb. ex Knight, endemic
- Serruria aitonii R.Br. endemic
- Serruria altiscapa Rourke, endemic
- Serruria balanocephala Rourke, endemic
- Serruria bolusii E.Phillips & Hutch. endemic
- Serruria brevifolia E.Phillips & Hutch. accepted as Paranomus capitatus (R.Br.) Kuntze, present
- Serruria brownii Meisn. endemic
- Serruria callosa Salisb. ex Knight, endemic
- Serruria candicans R.Br. endemic
- Serruria collina Salisb. ex Knight, endemic
- Serruria confragosa Rourke, endemic
- Serruria cyanoides (L.) R.Br. endemic
- Serruria cygnea R.Br. endemic
- Serruria decipiens R.Br. endemic
- Serruria decumbens (Thunb.) R.Br. endemic
- Serruria deluvialis Rourke, endemic
- Serruria diffusa R.Br. accepted as Serruria furcellata R.Br. present
- Serruria dodii E.Phillips & Hutch. endemic
- Serruria effusa Rourke, endemic
- Serruria elongata (P.J.Bergius) R.Br. endemic
- Serruria fasciflora Salisb. ex Knight, endemic
- Serruria flagellifolia Salisb. ex Knight, endemic
- Serruria flava Meisn. endemic
- Serruria florida (Thunb.) Salisb. ex Knight, endemic
- Serruria fucifolia Salisb. ex Knight, endemic
- Serruria furcellata R.Br. endemic
- Serruria glomerata (L.) R.Br. endemic
- Serruria gracilis Salisb. ex Knight, accepted as Serruria pinnata (Andr.) R.Br. present
- Serruria gremialis Rourke, endemic
- Serruria heterophylla Meisn. endemic
- Serruria hirsuta R.Br. endemic
- Serruria inconspicua L.Guthrie & T.M.Salter, endemic
- Serruria incrassata Meisn. endemic
- Serruria kraussii Meisn. endemic
- Serruria lacunosa Rourke, endemic
- Serruria leipoldtii E.Phillips & Hutch. endemic
- Serruria linearis Salisb. ex Knight, endemic
- Serruria meisneriana Schltr. endemic
- Serruria millefolia Salisb. ex Knight, endemic
- Serruria nervosa Meisn. endemic
- Serruria nivenii R.Br. endemic
- Serruria pedunculata (Lam.) R.Br. endemic
- Serruria phylicoides (P.J.Bergius) R.Br. endemic
- Serruria pinnata (Andr.) R.Br. endemic
- Serruria plumosa Meisn. accepted as Serruria nivenii R.Br. present
- Serruria rebeloi Rourke, endemic
- Serruria reflexa Rourke, endemic
- Serruria rosea E.Phillips, endemic
- Serruria rostellaris Salisb. ex Knight, endemic
- Serruria roxburghii R.Br. endemic
- Serruria rubricaulis R.Br. endemic
- Serruria scariosa R.Br. accepted as Serruria nivenii R.Br. present
- Serruria scoparia R.Br. endemic
- Serruria stellata Rourke, endemic
- Serruria trilopha Salisb. ex Knight, endemic
- Serruria triternata (Thunb.) R.Br. endemic
- Serruria ventricosa E.Phillips & Hutch. accepted as Serruria nervosa Meisn. present
- Serruria villosa (Lam.) R.Br. endemic
- Serruria viridifolia Rourke, endemic
- Serruria williamsii Rourke, endemic
- Serruria zeyheri Meisn. endemic

=== Sorocephalus ===
Genus Sorocephalus:

- Sorocephalus alopecurus Rourke, endemic
- Sorocephalus capitatus Rourke, endemic
- Sorocephalus clavigerus (Salisb. ex Knight) Hutch. endemic
- Sorocephalus crassifolius Hutch. endemic
- Sorocephalus imbricatus (Thunb.) R.Br. endemic
- Sorocephalus lanatus (Thunb.) R.Br. endemic
- Sorocephalus palustris Rourke, endemic
- Sorocephalus pinifolius (Salisb. ex Knight) Rourke, endemic
- Sorocephalus scabridus Meisn. endemic
- Sorocephalus tenuifolius R.Br. endemic
- Sorocephalus teretifolius (Meisn.) E.Phillips, endemic

=== Spatalla ===
Genus Spatalla:

- Spatalla argentea Rourke, endemic
- Spatalla barbigera Salisb. ex Knight, endemic
- Spatalla caudata (Thunb.) R.Br. endemic
- Spatalla colorata Meisn. endemic
- Spatalla confusa (E.Phillips) Rourke, endemic
- Spatalla curvifolia Salisb. ex Knight, endemic
- Spatalla ericoides E.Phillips, endemic
- Spatalla incurva (Thunb.) R.Br. endemic
- Spatalla longifolia Salisb. ex Knight, endemic
- Spatalla mollis R.Br. endemic
- Spatalla nubicola Rourke, endemic
- Spatalla parilis Salisb. ex Knight, endemic
- Spatalla prolifera (Thunb.) Salisb. ex Knight, endemic
- Spatalla propinqua R.Br. endemic
- Spatalla racemosa (L.) Druce, endemic
- Spatalla salsoloides (R.Br.) Rourke, endemic
- Spatalla setacea (R.Br.) Rourke, endemic
- Spatalla squamata Meisn. endemic
- Spatalla thyrsiflora Salisb. ex Knight, endemic
- Spatalla tulbaghensis (E.Phillips) Rourke, endemic

=== Telopea ===
Genus Telopea:

- Telopea speciosissima (Sm.) R.Br. not indigenous, cultivated, naturalised

=== Vexatorella ===
Genus Vexatorella:

- Vexatorella alpina (Salisb. ex Knight) Rourke, endemic
- Vexatorella amoena (Rourke) Rourke, endemic
- Vexatorella latebrosa Rourke, endemic
- Vexatorella obtusata (Thunb.) Rourke, indigenous
  - Vexatorella obtusata (Thunb.) Rourke subsp. albomontana (Rourke) Rourke, endemic
  - Vexatorella obtusata (Thunb.) Rourke subsp. obtusata, endemic
