= Serruria nervosa =

Conservation status
- Near Threatened (IUCN 3.1)

Scientific classification
- Kingdom: Plantae
- Clade: Tracheophytes
- Clade: Angiosperms
- Clade: Eudicots
- Order: Proteales
- Family: Proteaceae
- Genus: Serruria
- Species: S. nervosa

Binomial name
- Serruria nervosa Meisn.

Species of plant

Serruria nervosa, the fluted spiderhead, is a flowering shrub that belongs to the genus Serruria and forms part of the fynbos. The plant is endemic to the Western Cape and occurs from the Kleinrivierberge to the Elim plain and up to the coast. The shrub is small, upright and grows only 30 cm high and flowers from July to November

The plant dies after a fire but the seeds survive. Two months after flowering, the fruit falls and ants disperse the seeds. They store the seeds in their nests. The plant is unisexual. Pollination takes place through the action of insects. The plant grows in calcareous and acidic soil at elevations of 20 – 100 m.

== Sources ==
- REDLIST Sanbi
- Biodiversityexplorer
- Protea Atlas
- Plants of the World Online
