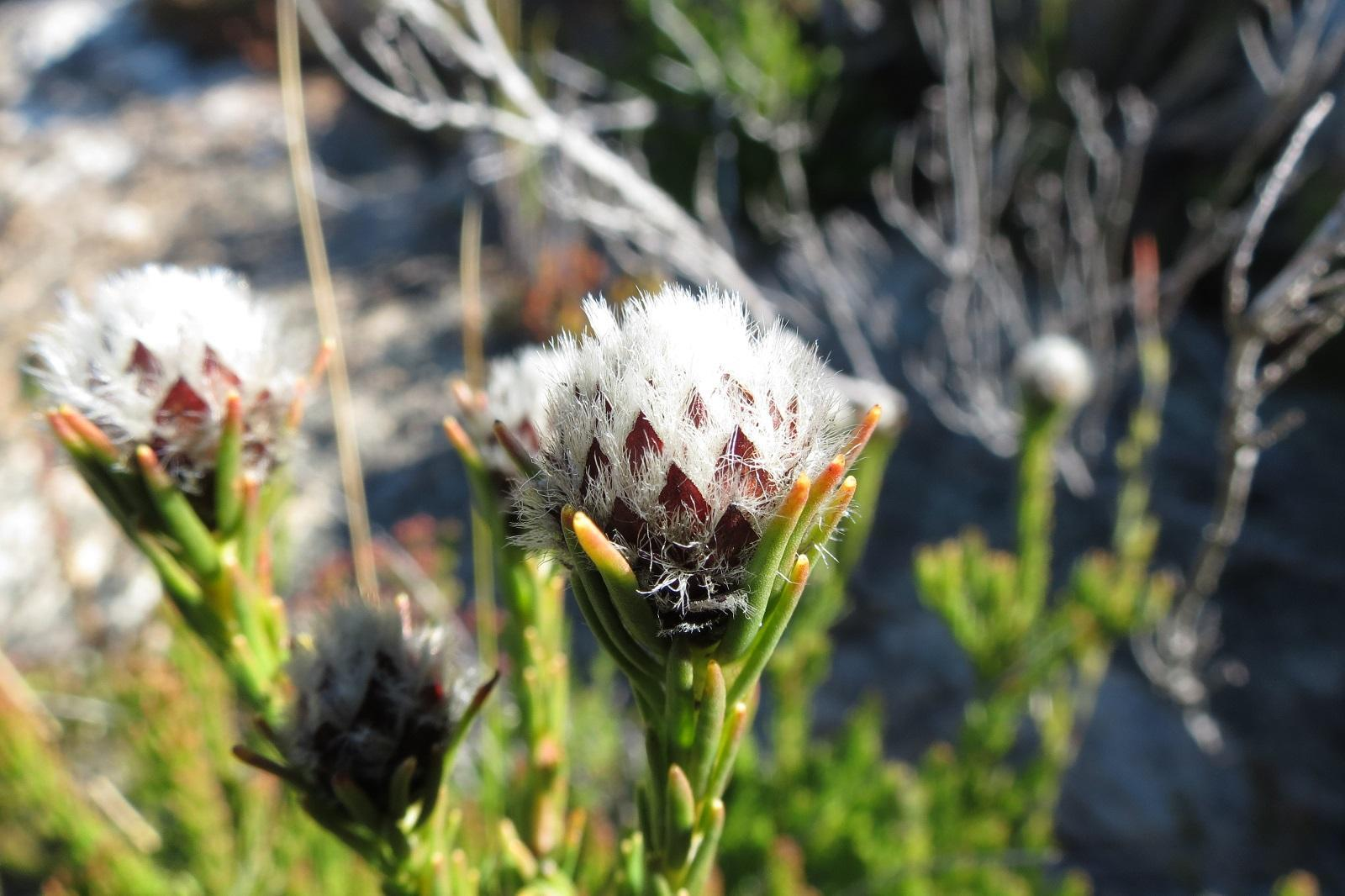

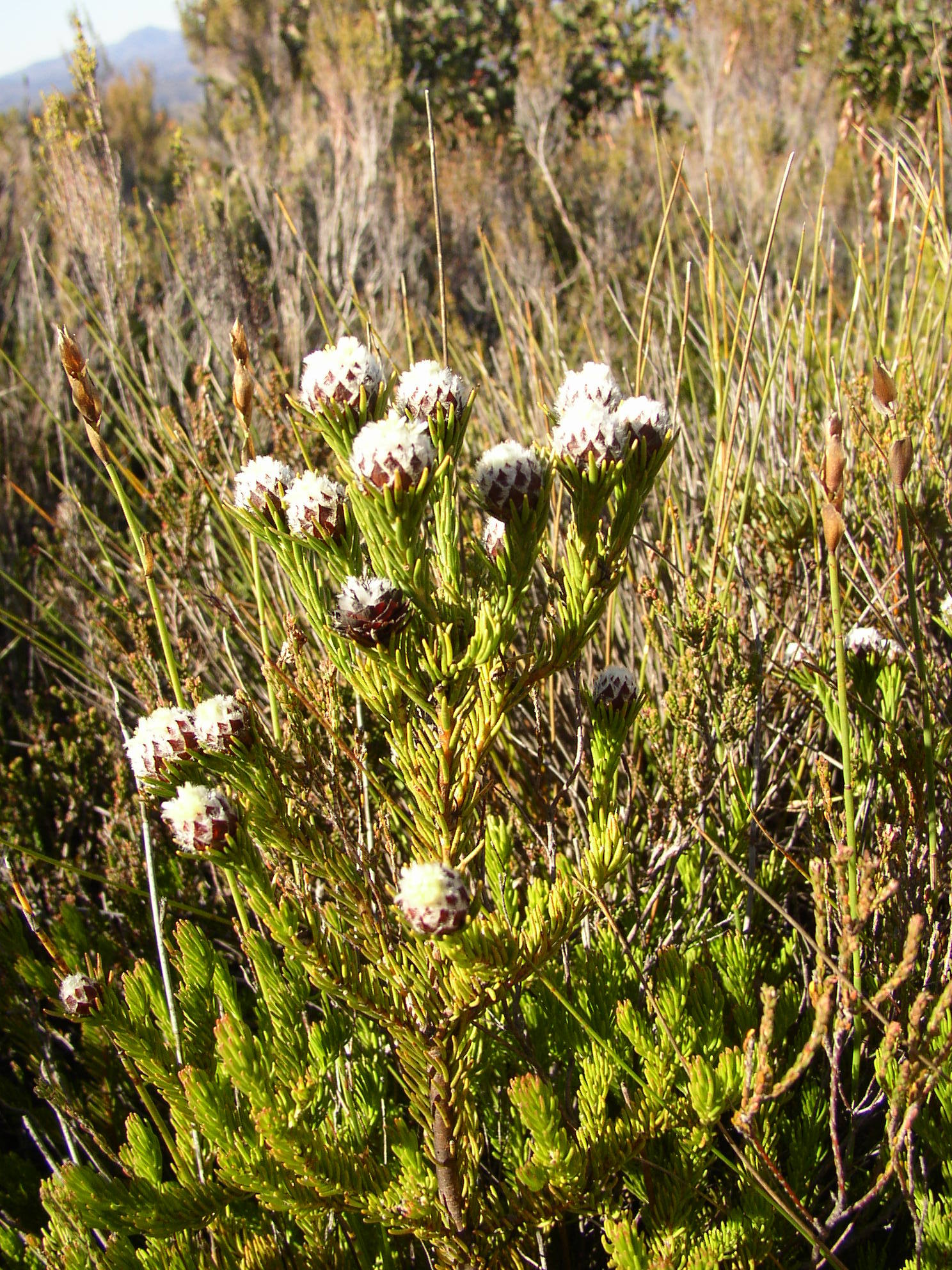

Conservation status
- Near Threatened (IUCN 3.1)

Scientific classification
- Kingdom: Plantae
- Clade: Tracheophytes
- Clade: Angiosperms
- Clade: Eudicots
- Order: Proteales
- Family: Proteaceae
- Genus: Leucadendron
- Species: L. sorocephalodes

Binomial name
- Leucadendron sorocephalodes E.Phillips & Hutch.

Synonyms
- Leucadendron scoparium E.Mey. ex Meisn.; Soranthe dregei (H.Buek ex Meisn.) Kuntze; Sorocephalus dregei H.Buek ex Meisn.; Sorocephalus intermedius H.Buek ex Meisn.

= Leucadendron sorocephalodes =

Species of plant

Leucadendron sorocephalodes, the woolly conebush, is a flower-bearing shrub belonging to the family Proteaceae. It is part of the South African fynbos vegetation type. The plant is native to the Western Cape and Eastern Cape where it occurs from the Outeniqua Mountains to the Baviaanskloof Mountains.

The shrub grows only 30 cm high but 2 m wide and flowers in August. The plant dies after a fire but the seeds survive. The seeds are stored in a toll on the female plant and fall out of the toll soil after two months where they are spread by ants. The plant is unisexual and there are separate plants with male and female flowers, which are pollinated by insects. The plant grows in sandstone rocks and stones at altitudes of 1 300-1 700 m.

In Afrikaans it is known as Wollerige tolbos.
