= Leucadendron nobile =

Conservation status
- Least Concern (IUCN 3.1)

Scientific classification
- Kingdom: Plantae
- Clade: Embryophytes
- Clade: Tracheophytes
- Clade: Angiosperms
- Clade: Eudicots
- Order: Proteales
- Family: Proteaceae
- Genus: Leucadendron
- Species: L. nobile

Binomial name
- Leucadendron nobile I.Williams

Species of plant endemic to South Africa

Leucadendron nobile is a species of plant in the family Proteaceae. It a shrub is endemic to the southern Cape Provinces of South Africa.
