= Leucadendron cadens =

Conservation status
- Least Concern (IUCN 3.1)

Scientific classification
- Kingdom: Plantae
- Clade: Tracheophytes
- Clade: Angiosperms
- Clade: Eudicots
- Order: Proteales
- Family: Proteaceae
- Genus: Leucadendron
- Species: L. cadens

Binomial name
- Leucadendron cadens I.Williams

Species of flowering plant

Leucadendron cadens, the Witteberg sunbush, is a flower-bearing shrub that belongs to the genus Leucadendron and forms part of the fynbos. The plant is native to the Western Cape, South Africa. The plant is rare.

== Description ==
The plant dies after a fire but the seeds survive. The seeds are stored in a toll on the female plant and only fall to the ground after the flower has ripened and are spread by rodents. The plant is unisexual and there are separate plants with male and female flowers, which are pollinated by the wind.

In Afrikaans, it is known as Witteberg-tolbos.

== Distribution and habitat ==
The plant occurs in the Witteberg Mountains south of Matjiesfontein in South Africa. The plant grows mainly on rotten quartzite ridges.
