= Leucadendron burchellii =

Conservation status
- Vulnerable (IUCN 3.1)

Scientific classification
- Kingdom: Plantae
- Clade: Tracheophytes
- Clade: Angiosperms
- Clade: Eudicots
- Order: Proteales
- Family: Proteaceae
- Genus: Leucadendron
- Species: L. burchellii

Binomial name
- Leucadendron burchellii I.Williams

Species of plant

Leucadendron burchellii, the Riviersonderend conebush, is a flower-bearing shrub that belongs to the genus Leucadendron and forms part of the fynbos. The plant is native to the Western Cape, South Africa.

== Description ==
The shrub grows 1.6 m (5.2 ft) tall and flowers in August. The plant dies after a fire but the seeds survive. The seeds are stored in a toll on the female plant and fall to the ground after two months. The seed is then spread by ants that carry it to their nests. The plant is unisexual and there are separate plants with male and female flowers, which are pollinated by small beetles.

In Afrikaans, it is known as the Riviersonderend-tolbos.

== Distribution and habitat ==
The plant occurs in the Riviersonderend Mountains from Jonaskop to McGregor. The plant grows on northern slopes in rocky or sandy sandstone soils at altitudes of 800 to 1,000 m (2,600 to 3,300 ft).
