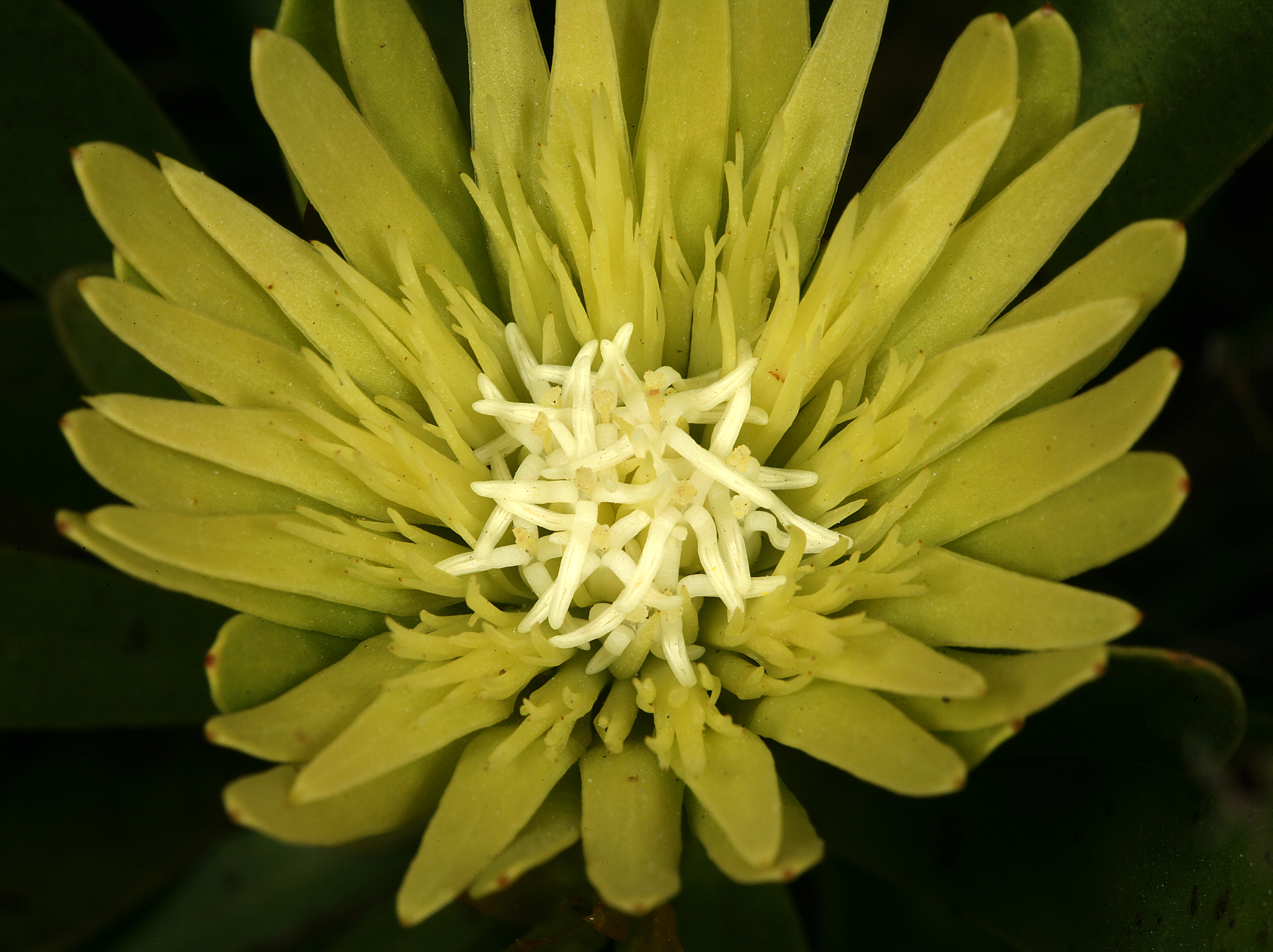

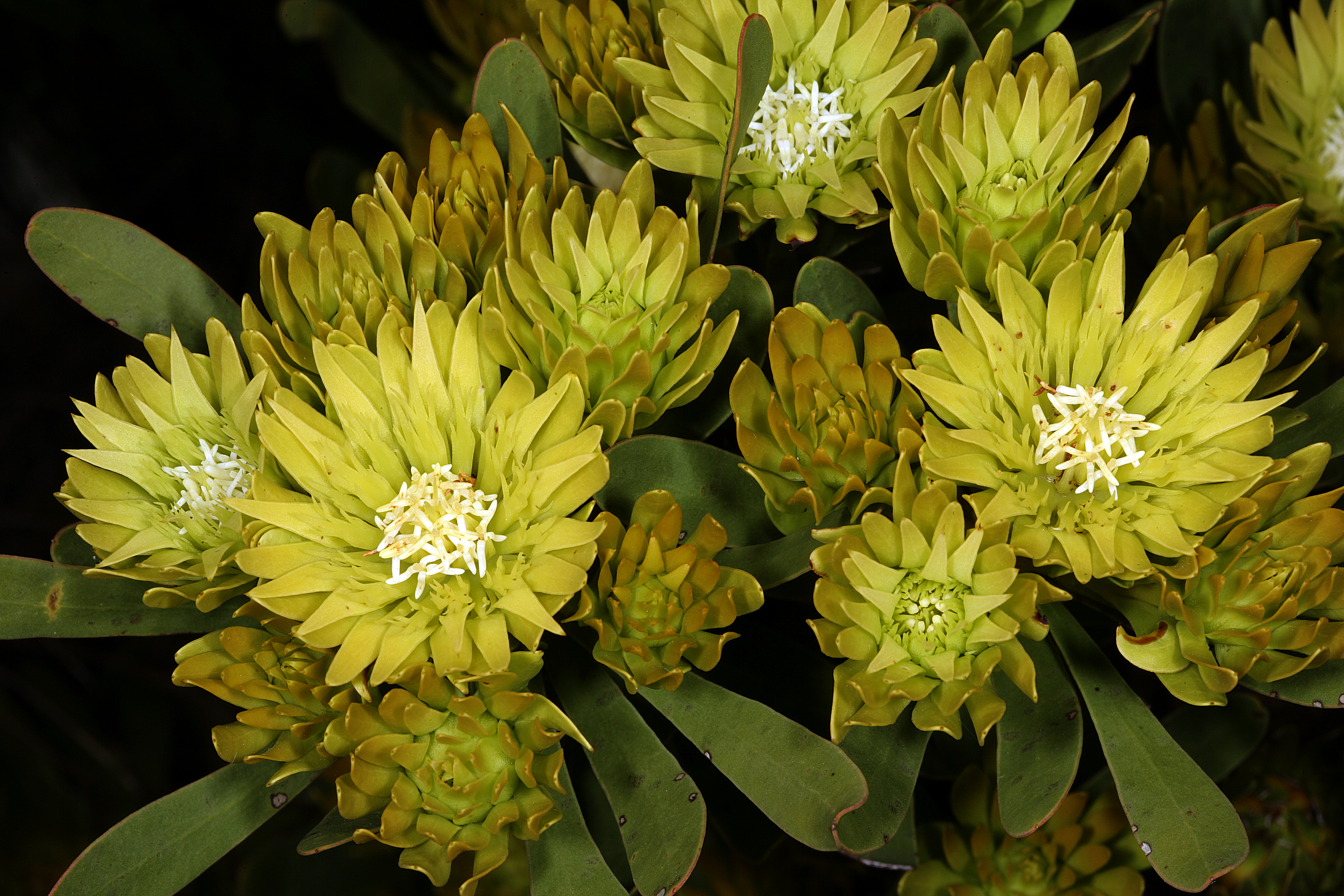

Conservation status
- Least Concern (IUCN 3.1)

Scientific classification
- Kingdom: Plantae
- Clade: Tracheophytes
- Clade: Angiosperms
- Clade: Eudicots
- Order: Proteales
- Family: Proteaceae
- Genus: Aulax
- Species: A. umbellata

Binomial name
- Aulax umbellata (Thunb.) R.Br., 1781

= Aulax umbellata =

Flowering shrub from South Africa

Aulax umbellata, the broad-leaf featherbush, is a shrub native to the Western Cape. It occurs on the lower slopes and coastal lowlands from Kogelberg to Mossel Bay up to altitudes of 500 m. The shrub grows with a single stem and grows up to 2.5 m tall. Umbellata means like an umbrella. The leaves have rounded tips and can become 110 mm long and 15 mm in diameter. The plant is bisexual, male and female flowers grow on different plants. The plants bloom from September to February. A variety of insect species help pollinate the plants. Female flowers dry out and form a woody shell in which the seeds are formed and preserved. Fires destroy the plant and only the seeds survive.

In Afrikaans, the plant is known as the veerkanariebos.
