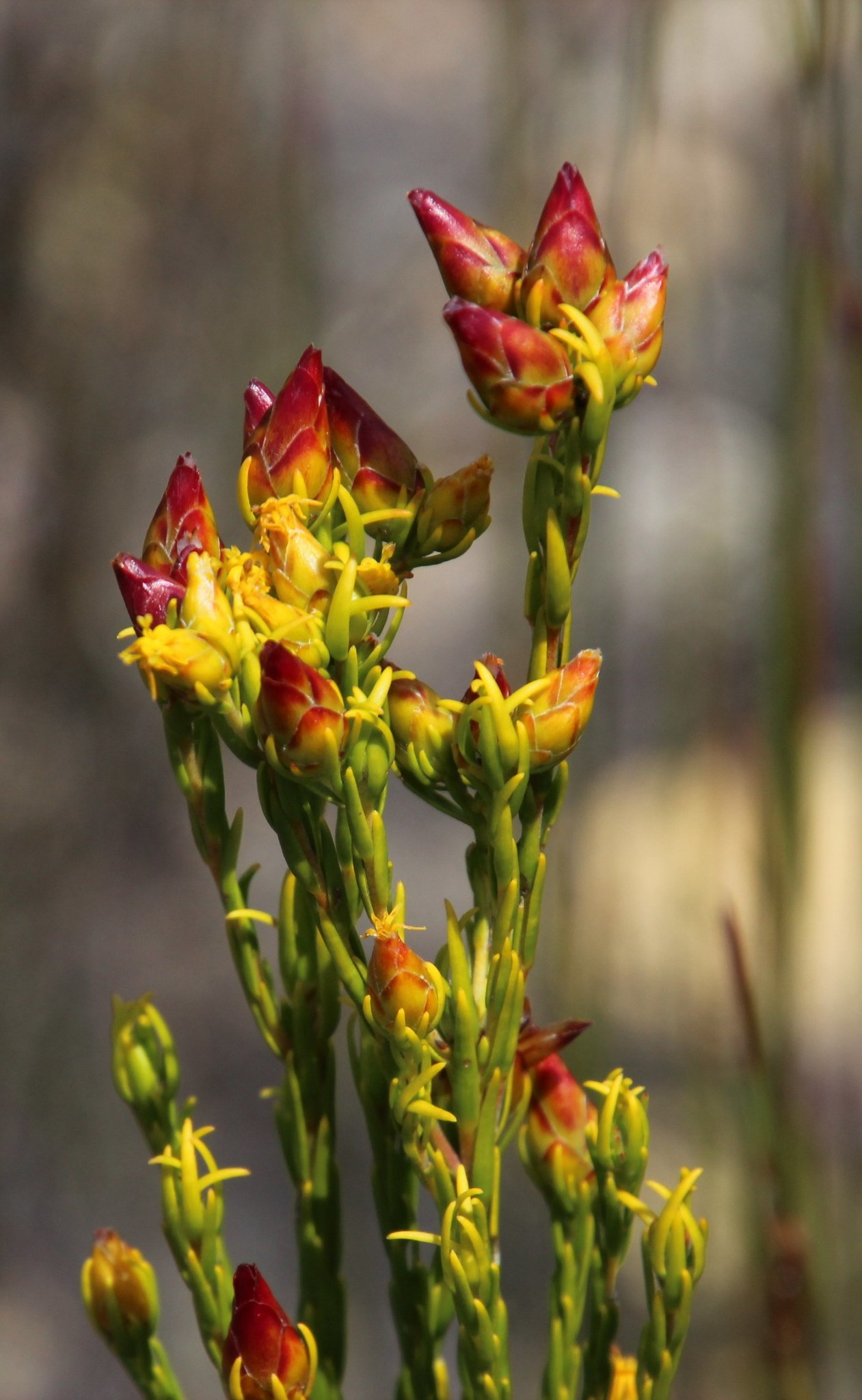

Conservation status
- Vulnerable (IUCN 3.1)

Scientific classification
- Kingdom: Plantae
- Clade: Tracheophytes
- Clade: Angiosperms
- Clade: Eudicots
- Order: Proteales
- Family: Proteaceae
- Genus: Leucadendron
- Species: L. olens

Binomial name
- Leucadendron olens I.Williams

= Leucadendron olens =

Species of plant

Leucadendron olens, the yellow conebush, is a flower-bearing shrub that belongs to the genus Leucadendron and forms part of the fynbos. The plant is native to the Western Cape, South Africa.

== Description ==
The upright shrub grows 1.2 m (3.9 ft) tall and flowers in June. Fire destroys the plant but the seeds survive. The seeds are stored in a toll on the female plant, and when ripe, released and carried by ants to their nests. The plant is unisexual and there are separate plants with male and female flowers, which are pollinated by insects.

In Afrikaans, it is known as the Geeltolbos.

== Distribution and habitat ==
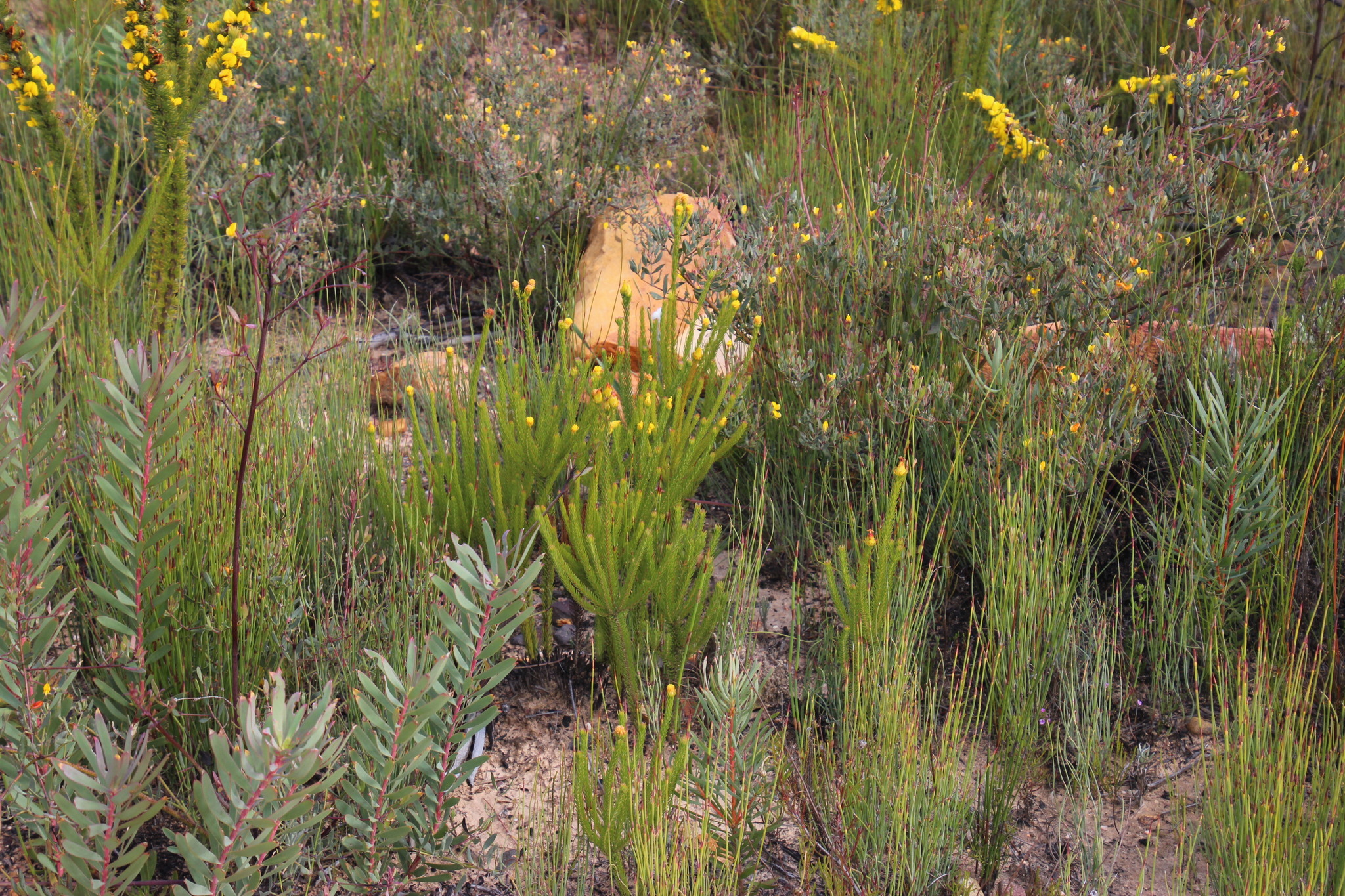

The plant occurs in the Doring River Valley and the Grootdoring River of the Outeniqua Mountains, South Africa. It is terrestrial and grows mainly in dry sandstone on northern slopes of 590–800 m (1,940–2,620 ft).

== Gallery ==
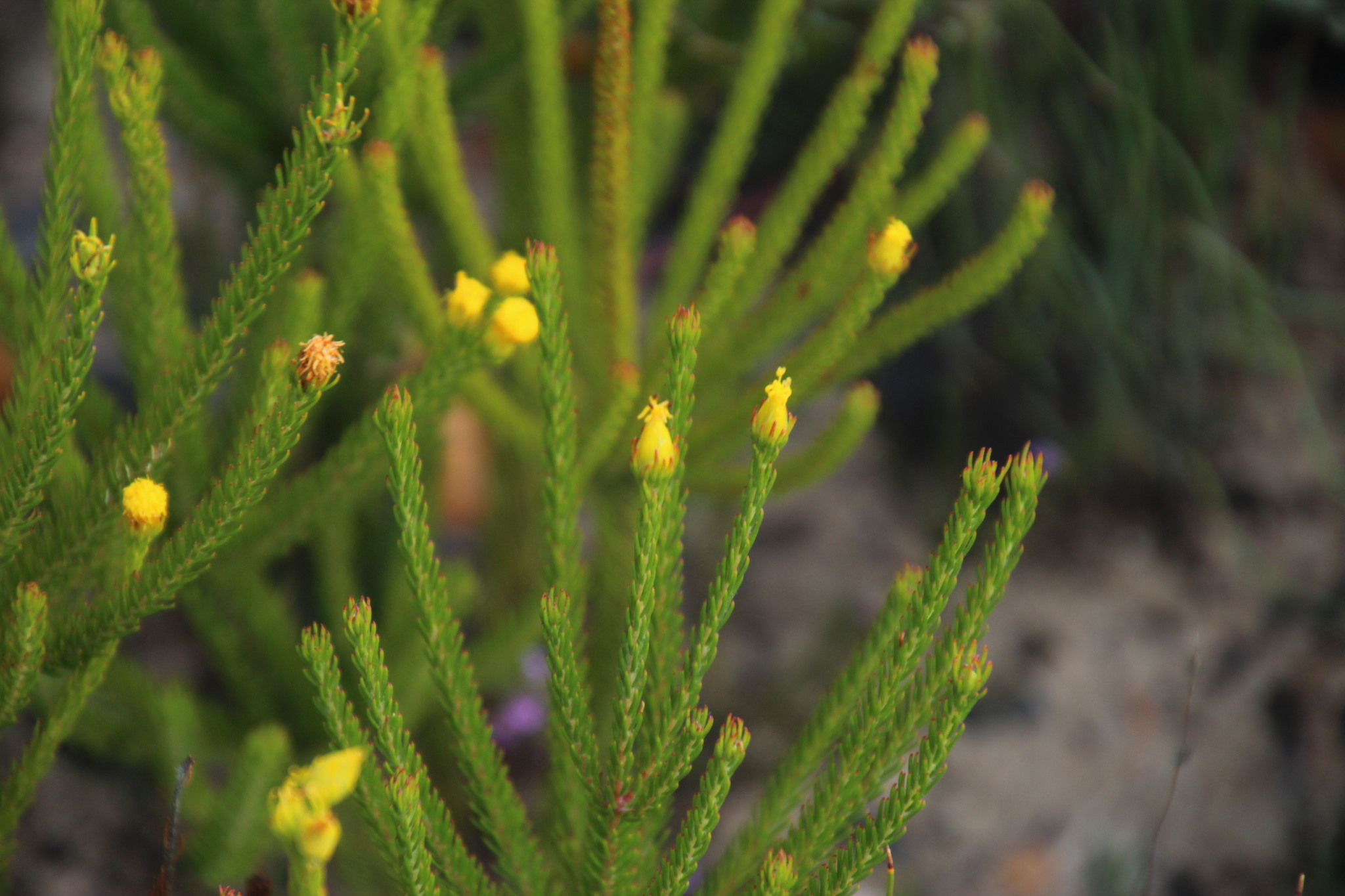

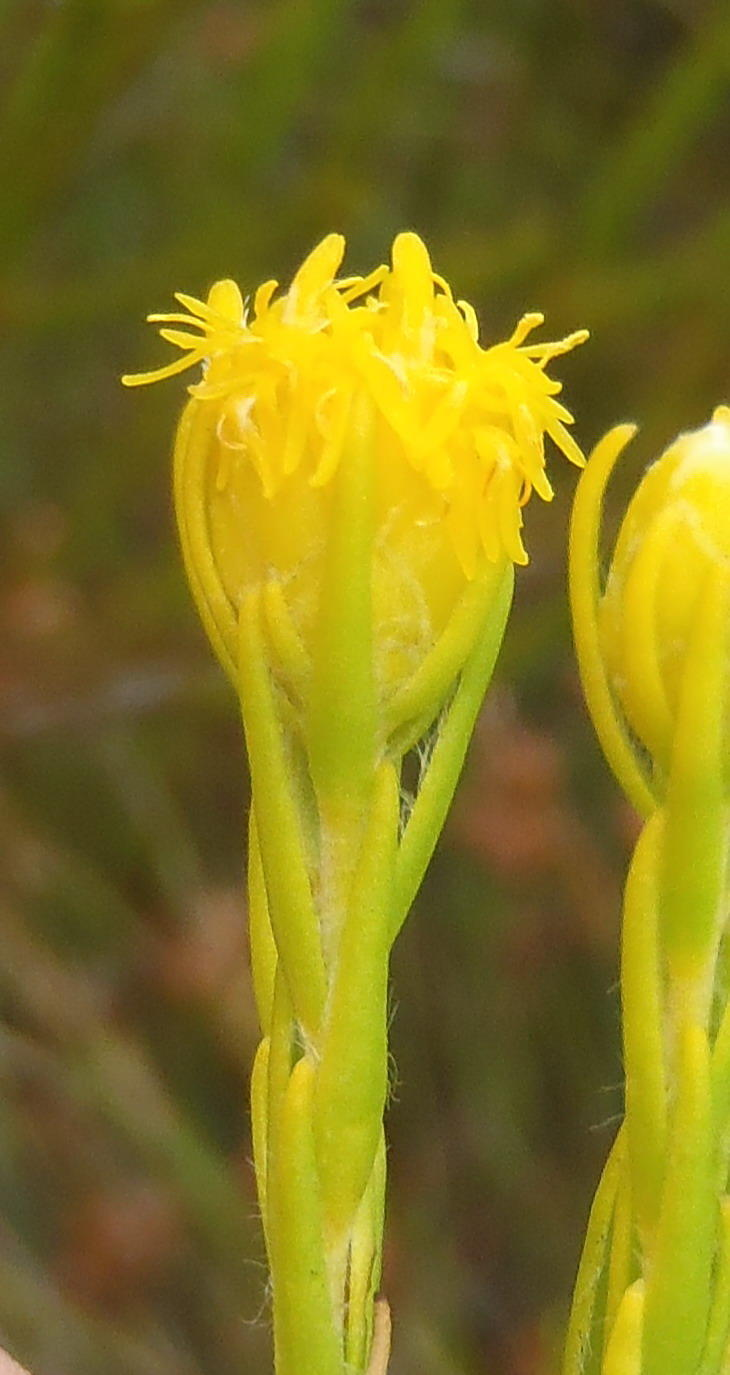
