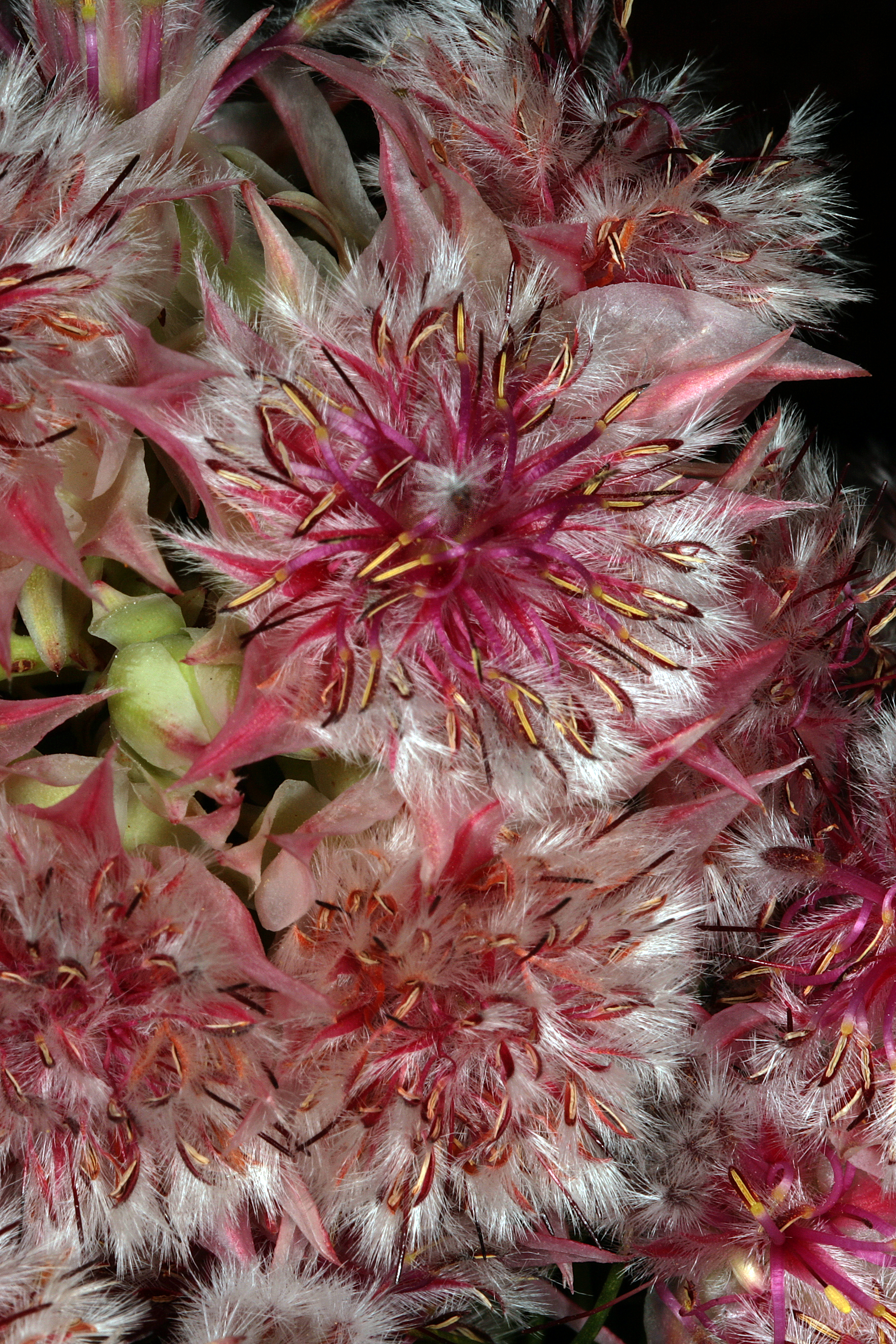

Conservation status
- Near Threatened (IUCN 3.1)

Scientific classification
- Kingdom: Plantae
- Clade: Tracheophytes
- Clade: Angiosperms
- Clade: Eudicots
- Order: Proteales
- Family: Proteaceae
- Genus: Serruria
- Species: S. rosea

Binomial name
- Serruria rosea E.Phillips

= Serruria rosea =

Species of plant

Serruria rosea, the rose spiderhead, is a flower-bearing shrub that belongs to the genus Serruria and forms part of the fynbos. The plant is native to the Western Cape, South Africa.

== Description ==
Fire destroys the plant but the seeds survive. Two months after flowering, the fruit falls off and ants disperse the seeds. They store the seeds in their nests. The plant is bisexual. Pollination takes place through the action of insects. The shrub is erect and grows 0.8–1 m (2 ft 7 in – 3 ft 3 in) tall and bears flowers from August to October.

In Afrikaans, it is known as the Bruidsbos.

== Distribution and habitat ==
The plant only occurs in the Hottentots Holland Mountains from Slanghoek Mountains to Franschhoek. It grows in sandy soil at altitudes of 300–620 m (980–2,030 ft).
