= Serruria dodii =

Conservation status
- Least Concern (IUCN 3.1)

Scientific classification
- Kingdom: Plantae
- Clade: Tracheophytes
- Clade: Angiosperms
- Clade: Eudicots
- Order: Proteales
- Family: Proteaceae
- Genus: Serruria
- Species: S. dodii

Binomial name
- Serruria dodii E.Phillips & Hutch.

Species of plant

Serruria dodii, the Hex River spiderhead, is a flowering shrub that belongs to the family Proteaceae. It is part of the South African fynbos vegetation type. The plant is endemic to the Western Cape and occurs in the Hex River Mountains and Keeromsberg. The shrub grows upright, reaches a height of 1.0 m and flowers from August to November.

The plant dies after a fire but the seeds survive. Two months after flowering, the fruit falls and ants disperse the seeds. They store the seeds in their nests. The plant is unisexual. Pollination takes place through the action of insects. The plant grows in sandstone soil at elevations of 900 - 1,400 m.

== Sources ==
- REDLIST Sanbi
- Protea Atlas
- Plants of the World Online
