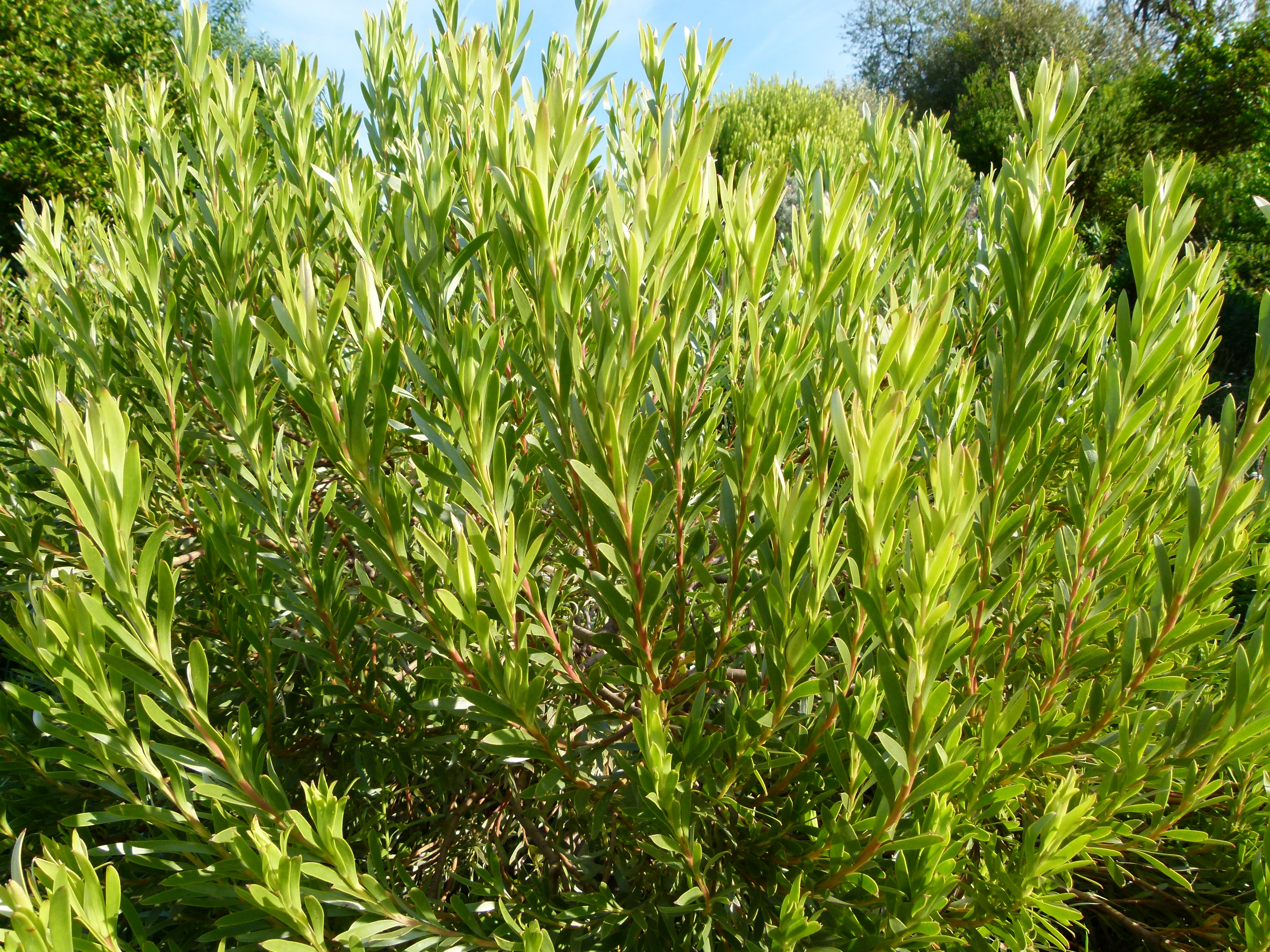

Conservation status
- Near Threatened (IUCN 3.1)

Scientific classification
- Kingdom: Plantae
- Clade: Tracheophytes
- Clade: Angiosperms
- Clade: Eudicots
- Order: Proteales
- Family: Proteaceae
- Genus: Leucadendron
- Species: L. modestum

Binomial name
- Leucadendron modestum I.Williams

= Leucadendron modestum =

Species of flowering plant

Leucadendron modestum, the rough-leaf conebush, is a flower-bearing shrub that belongs to the genus Leucadendron and forms part of the fynbos. The plant is native to the Western Cape, South Africa.

== Description ==
The shrub grows 60 cm (24 in) tall and bears flowers in August. Fire destroys the plant but the seeds survive. The seeds are stored in a toll on the female plant and are released after a fire and possibly spread by the wind. The plant is unisexual; there are male and female plants.

In Afrikaans, it is known as skugtertolbos.

== Distribution and habitat ==
The plant occurs on the Elim Plain from Stanford and Bredasdorp to Cape Agulhas. It grows mainly on level gravel or clay soil at heights of 0–165 m (0–541 ft).
