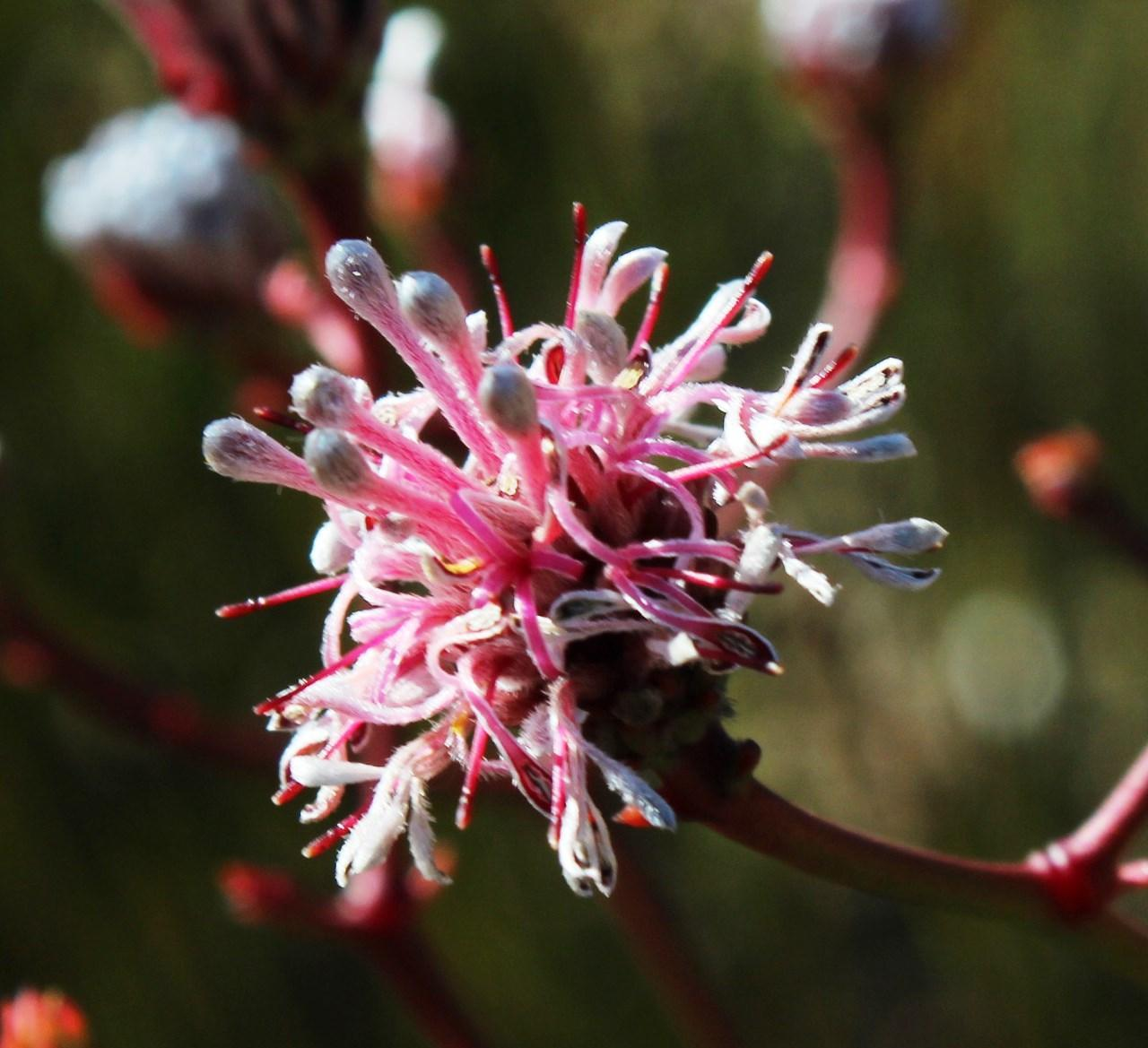

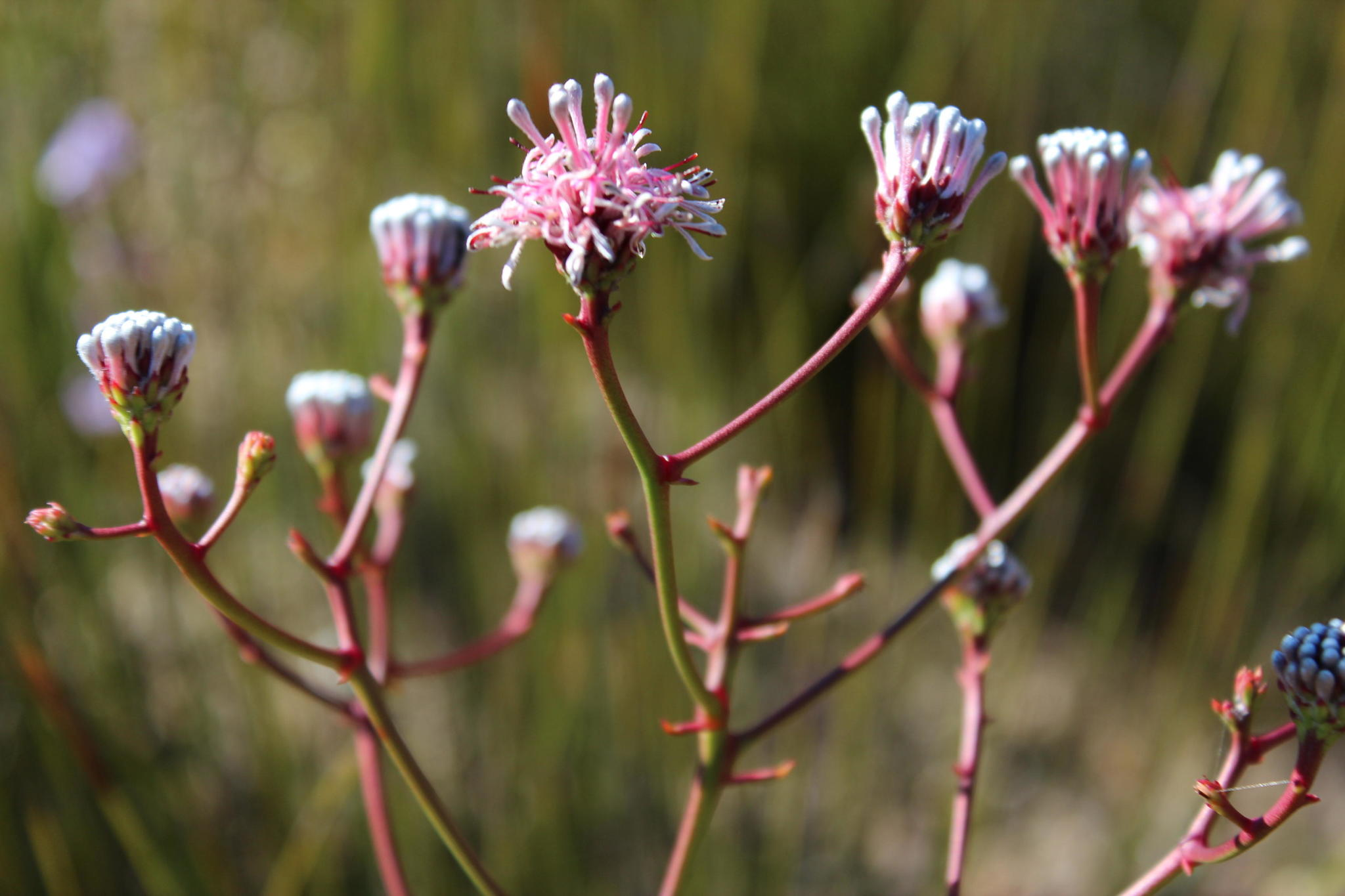

Conservation status
- Endangered (IUCN 3.1)

Scientific classification
- Kingdom: Plantae
- Clade: Tracheophytes
- Clade: Angiosperms
- Clade: Eudicots
- Order: Proteales
- Family: Proteaceae
- Genus: Serruria
- Species: S. williamsii

Binomial name
- Serruria williamsii Rourke

= Serruria williamsii =

Species of plant

Serruria williamsii, commonly known as the king spiderhead, is a flower-bearing shrub that belongs to the genus Serruria and forms part of the fynbos. The plant is native to the Western Cape and only occurs in the Riviersonderend Mountains.

In Afrikaans it is known as koningsspinnekopbos.

The leaves of the plant are whorled below the flowerhead stalk, and are curved upwards. They are dissected, stout, and fleshy, approximately 150–220 mm (5.9–8.7 in) in length and 30–40 mm (1.2–1.6 in) wide. The flowerhead stalk is 100–300 mm (3.9–11.8 in) long. The flowerheads are a panicle of lax (i.e. loose) racemes.

== See also ==
Glossary of botanical terms § L: lax
