= Leucadendron bonum =

Conservation status
- Critically Endangered (IUCN 3.1)

Scientific classification
- Kingdom: Plantae
- Clade: Embryophytes
- Clade: Tracheophytes
- Clade: Angiosperms
- Clade: Eudicots
- Order: Proteales
- Family: Proteaceae
- Genus: Leucadendron
- Species: L. bonum

Binomial name
- Leucadendron bonum I.Williams

Species of flowering plant

Leucadendron bonum, the Gideonskop conebush, is a flower-bearing shrub that belongs to the genus Leucadendron and forms part of the fynbos. The plant is native to the Western Cape, South Africa.

== Description ==
The shrub grows 1.6 m (5.2 ft) and bears flowers in October.

In Afrikaans, it is known as the gideonskoptolbos.

== Distribution and habitat ==
The plant occurs in the Kouebokkeveld Mountains near Gideonskop.
