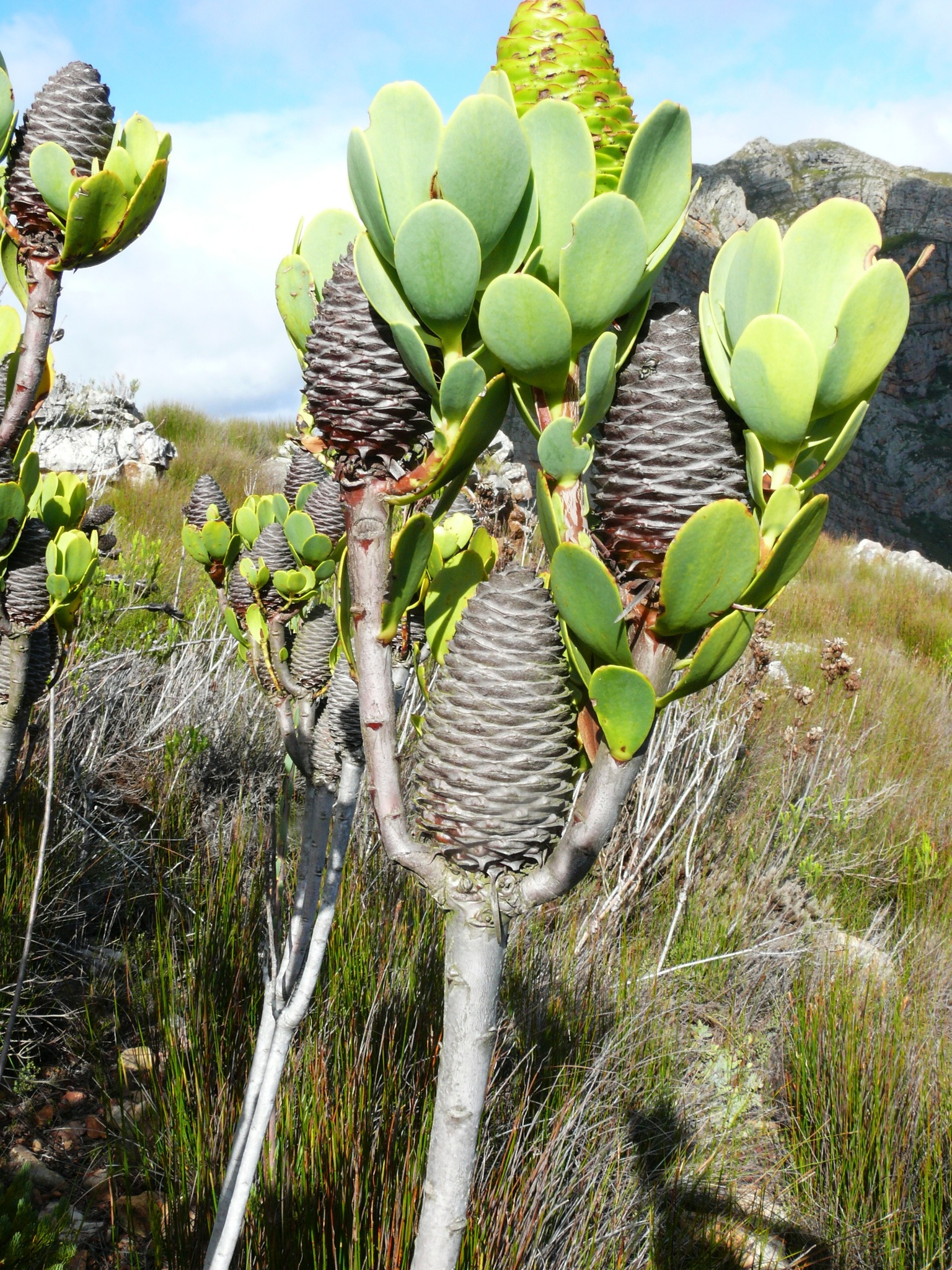

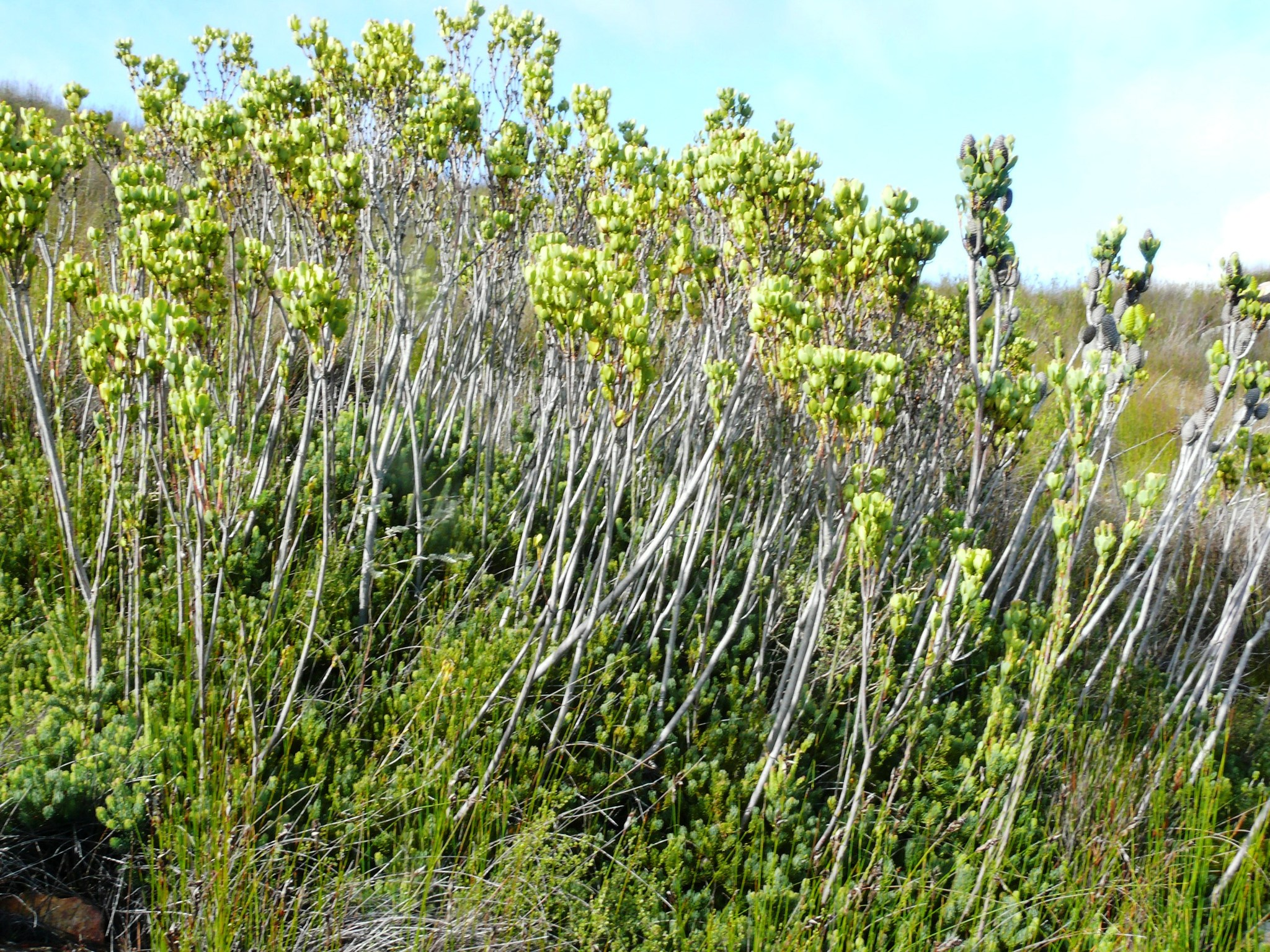

Conservation status
- Critically Endangered (IUCN 3.1)

Scientific classification
- Kingdom: Plantae
- Clade: Tracheophytes
- Clade: Angiosperms
- Clade: Eudicots
- Order: Proteales
- Family: Proteaceae
- Genus: Leucadendron
- Species: L. immoderatum

Binomial name
- Leucadendron immoderatum Rourke

= Leucadendron immoderatum =

Species of plant

Leucadendron immoderatum, the lollipop conebush, is a flower-bearing shrub belonging to the genus Leucadendron and forms part of the fynbos. The plant is native to the Western Cape where it occurs at Riviersonderend.

The shrub grows 2 m high. The population is critically endangered and little information is known about the species. The plant grows on northern slopes at altitudes of 1,300 m.

In Afrikaans it is known as Suigstokkie-tolbos.
