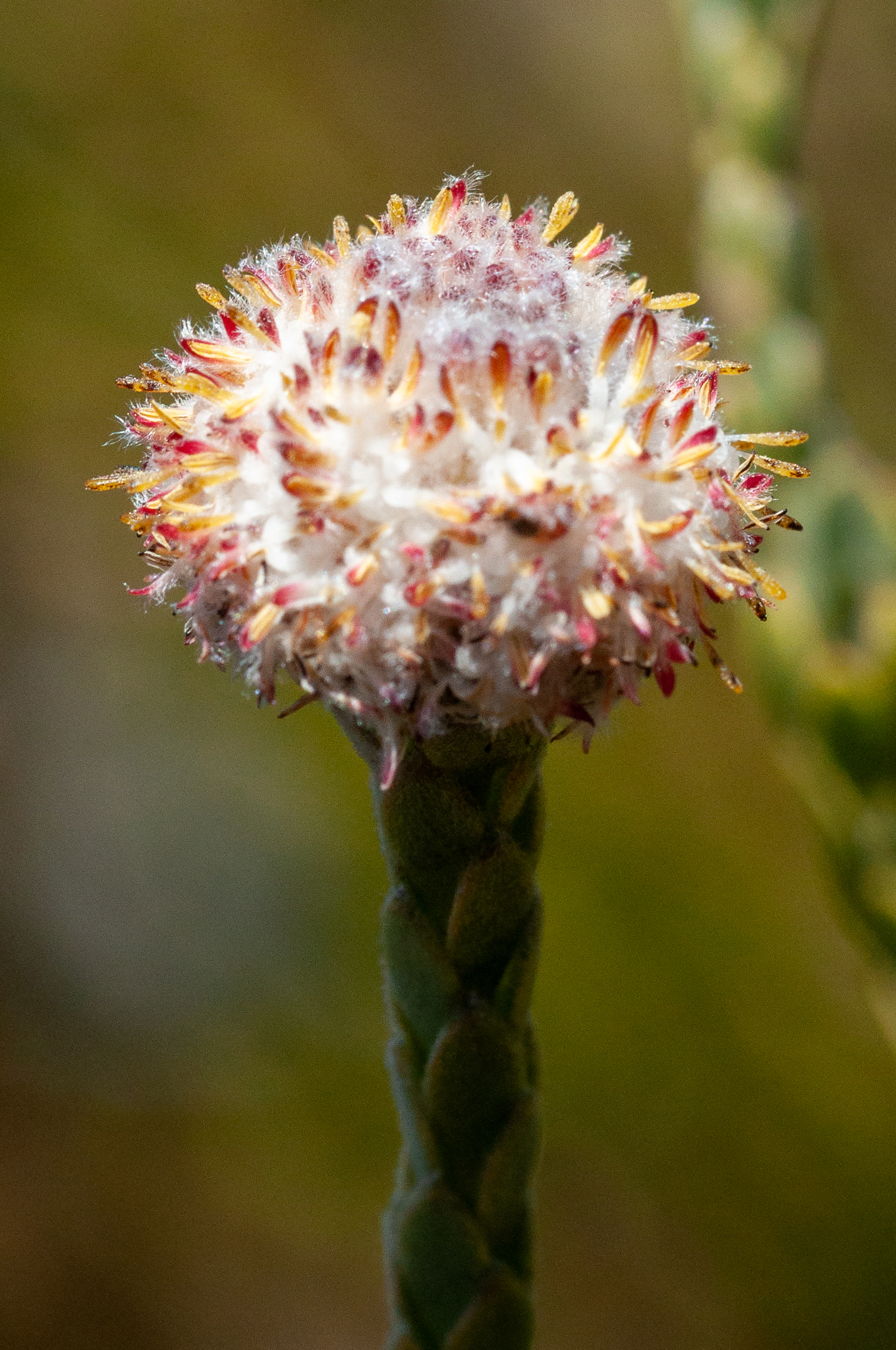

Conservation status
- Near Threatened (IUCN 3.1)

Scientific classification
- Kingdom: Plantae
- Clade: Tracheophytes
- Clade: Angiosperms
- Clade: Eudicots
- Order: Proteales
- Family: Proteaceae
- Genus: Leucadendron
- Species: L. dubium

Binomial name
- Leucadendron dubium (H.Buek ex Meisn.) E.Phillips & Hutch.

= Leucadendron dubium =

Species of plant

Leucadendron dubium, the Cederberg conebush, is a flower-bearing shrub that belongs to the genus Leucadendron and forms part of the fynbos. The plant is native to the Western Cape in the Cederberg. The plant's habitat is threatened by the rooibos tea industry.

In Afrikaans, it known as vuurslaanbos.

== Gallery ==
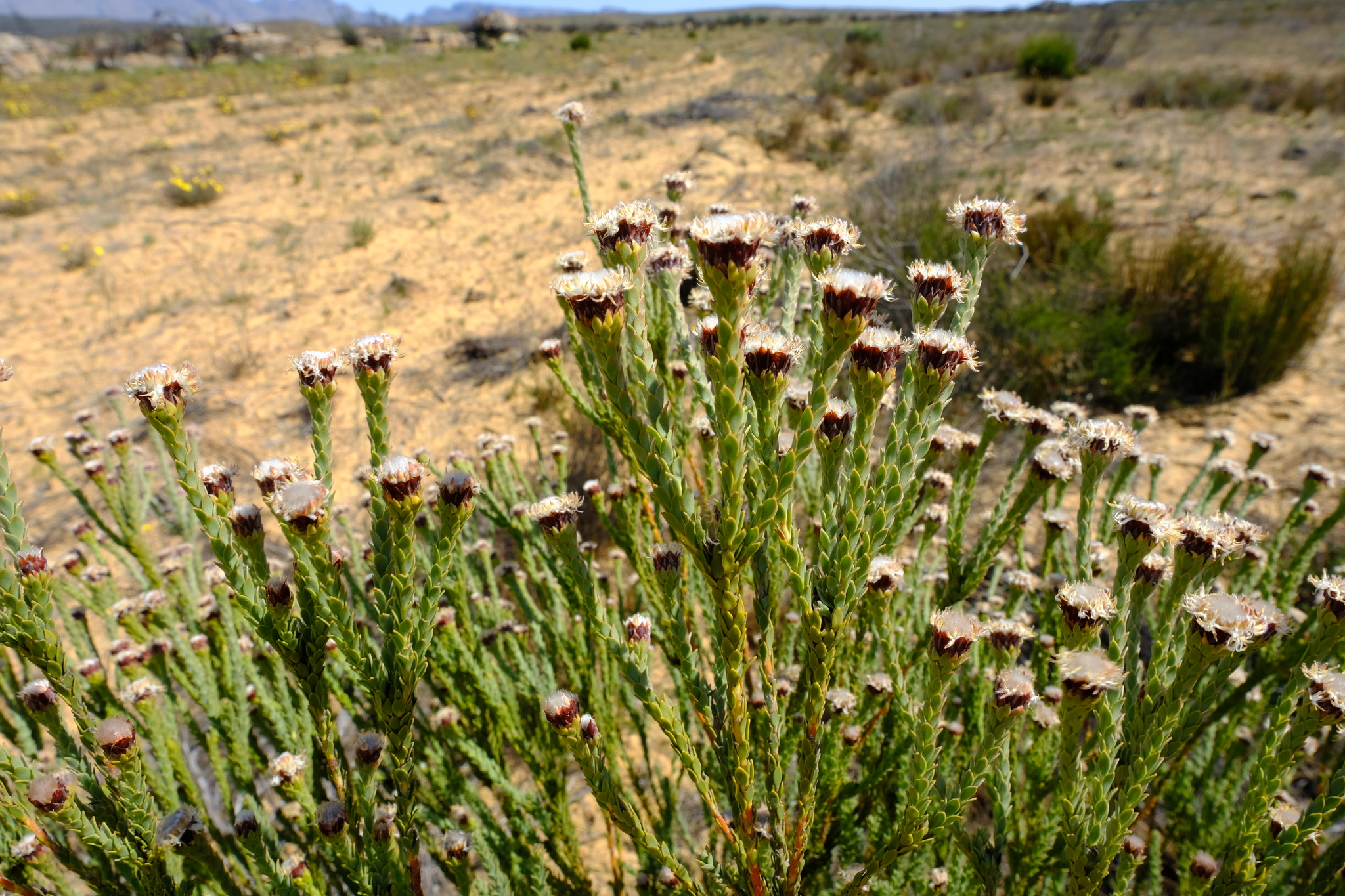

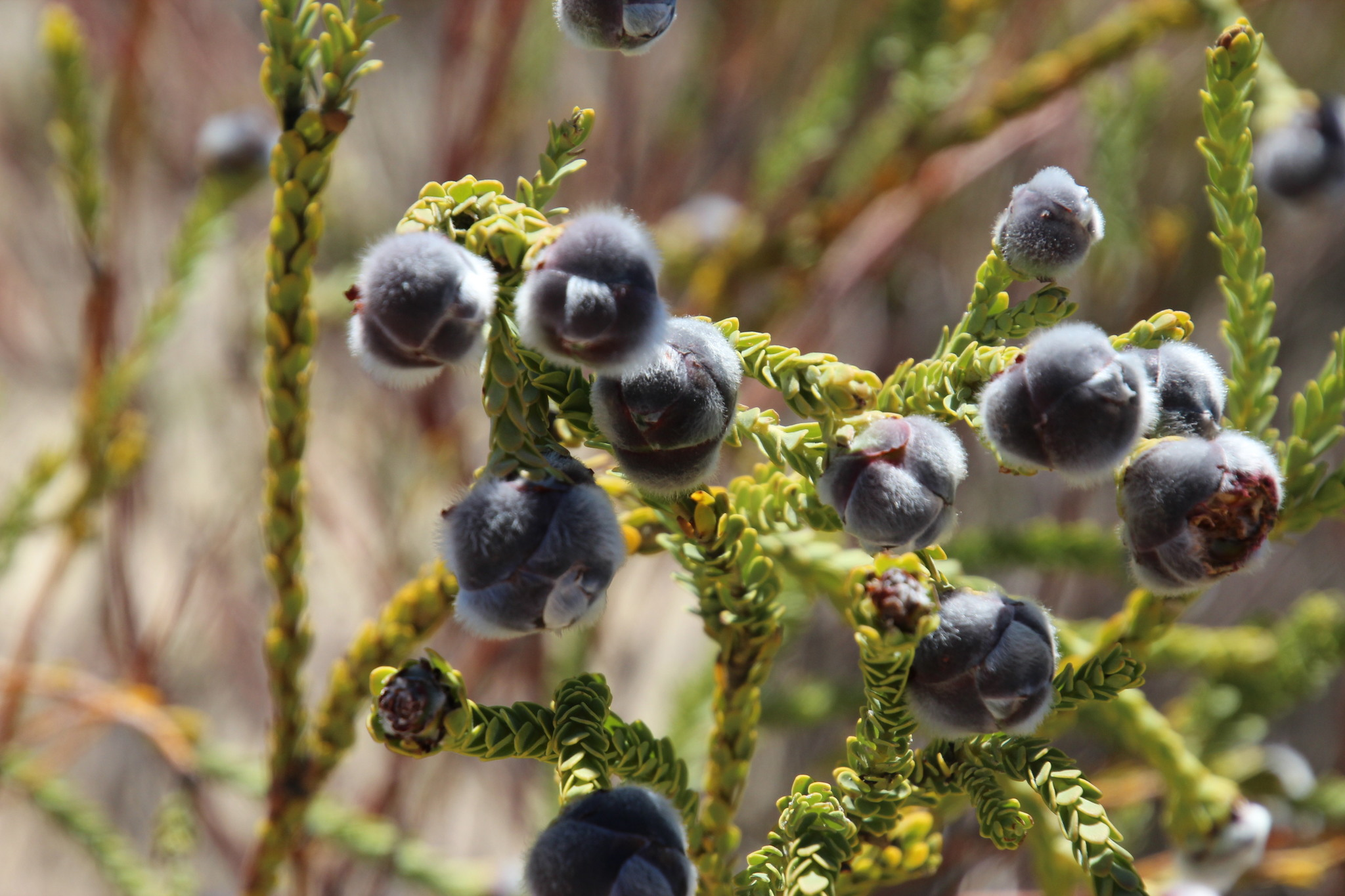

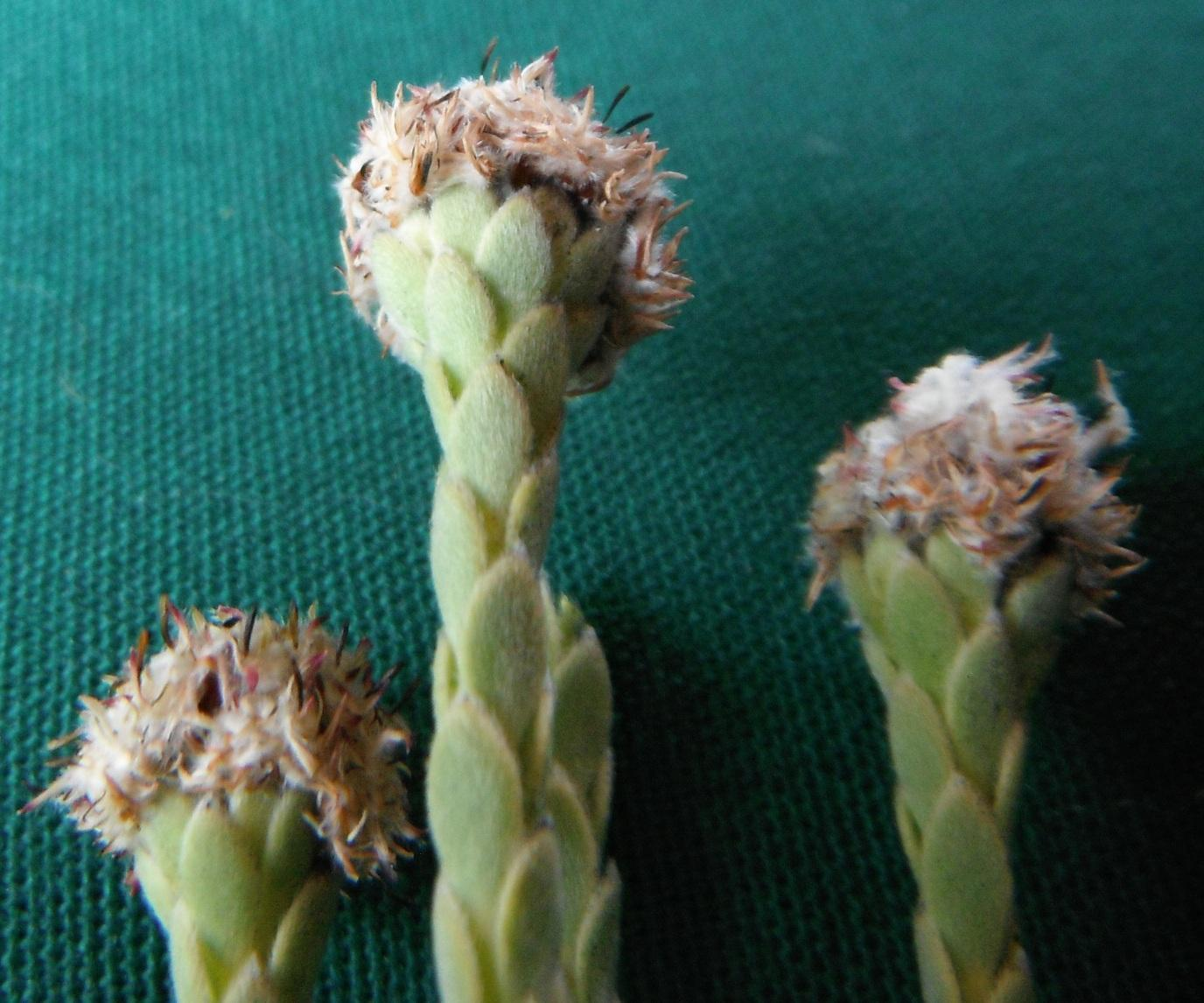

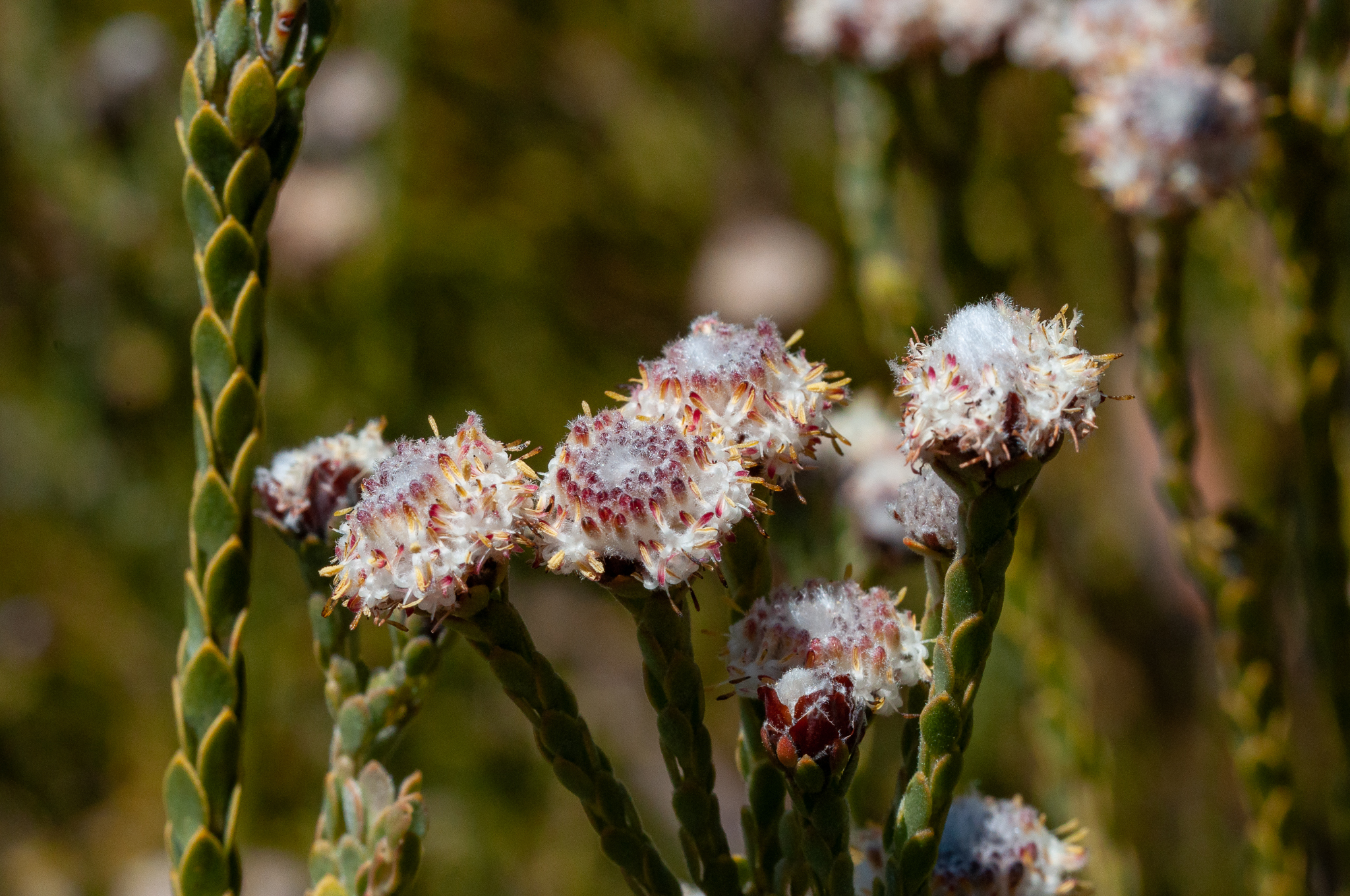

== Sources ==
- "Leucadendron dubium (Cederberg conebush)". biodiversityexplorer.info.
- "Threatened Species Programme | SANBI Red List of South African Plants". redlist.sanbi.org.
