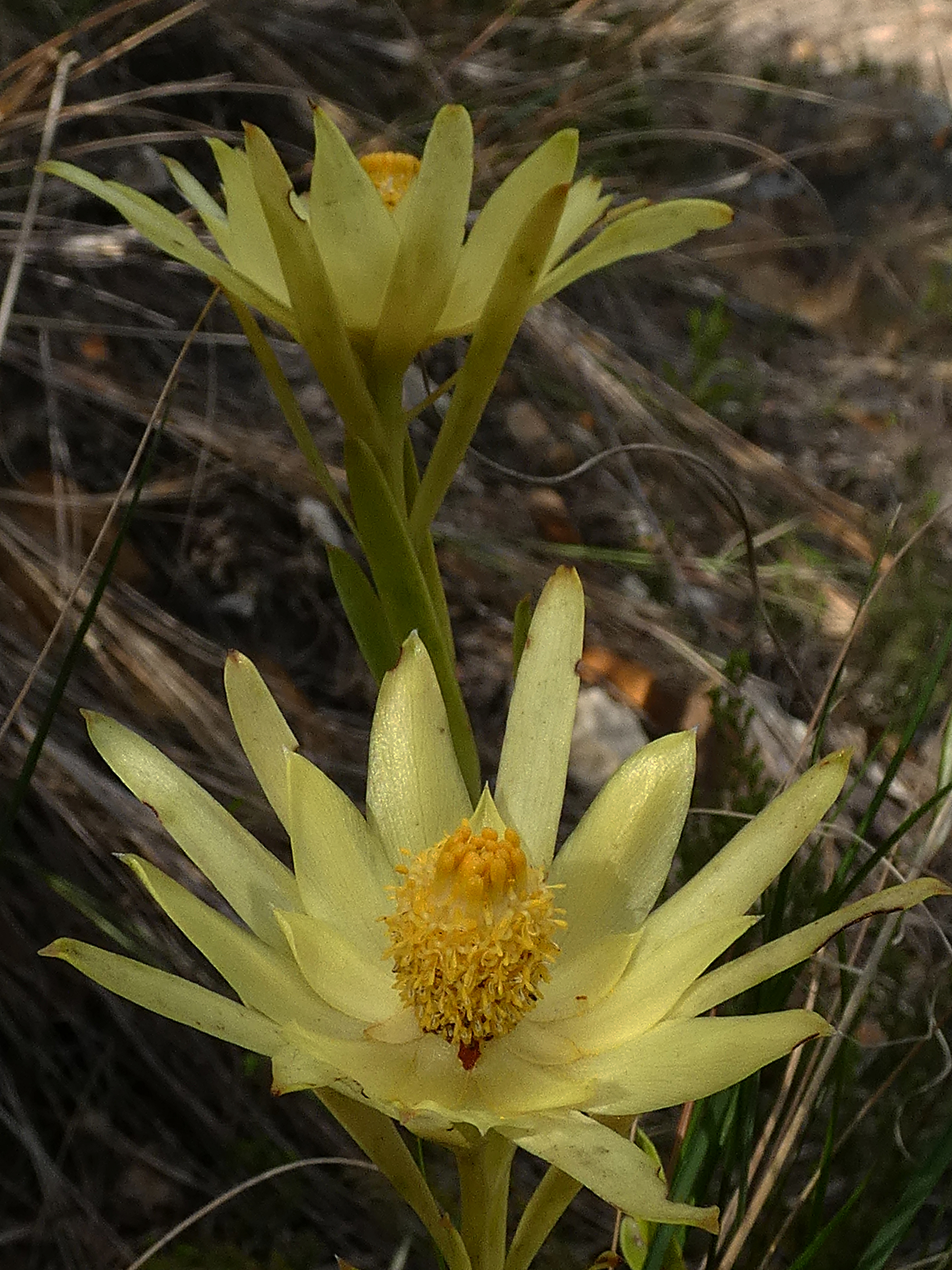

Conservation status
- Least Concern (IUCN 3.1)

Scientific classification
- Kingdom: Plantae
- Clade: Tracheophytes
- Clade: Angiosperms
- Clade: Eudicots
- Order: Proteales
- Family: Proteaceae
- Genus: Leucadendron
- Species: L. xanthoconus

Binomial name
- Leucadendron xanthoconus (Kuntze) K.Schum.

= Leucadendron xanthoconus =

Species of shrub

Leucadendron xanthoconus is a species of plant in the family Proteaceae native to South Africa. The 1–2 m shrub is quite common and dominant in regions of South Africa, specifically in mountain fynbos in the south-western Cape. With the species being serotinous, it accumulates seeds into woody cones for 2-3 years, which are then released all together after burning, ultimately killing the plant. Seeds released during the inter-fire interval, which is between 10 and 20 years, do not form persistent seedbanks in the soil, making inter-fire recruitment insignificant. According to Bond and Maze, this allows for populations to consist of even aged plants dating from the previous burn. With the appropriate conditions and the necessary nutrients and water during the first six months, it can grow at a very fast rate. Its productivity is positively impacted by an increase in water. It can also be impacted by droughts as the overall weight of the leaves and roots is reduced.

== Gallery ==
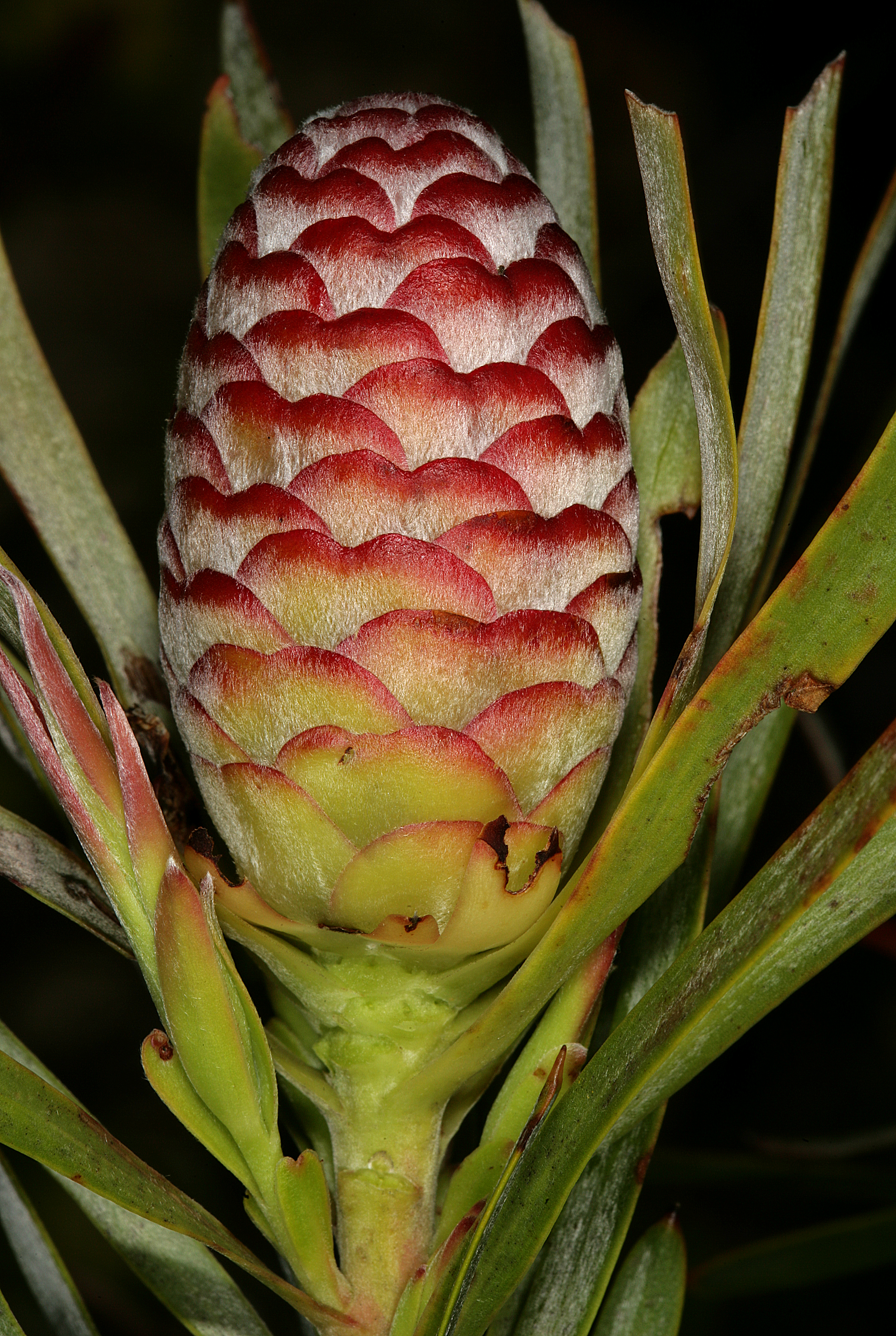

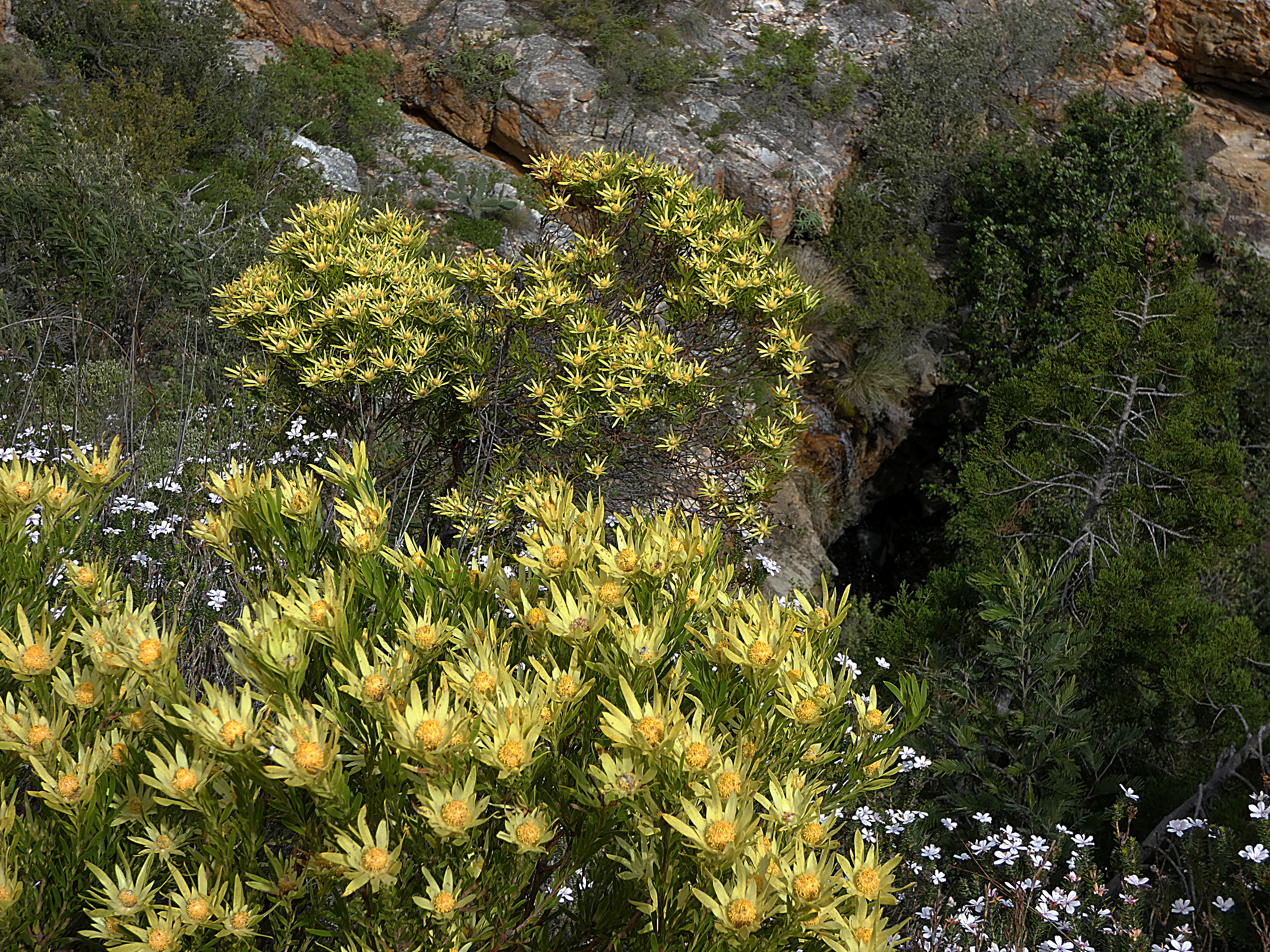

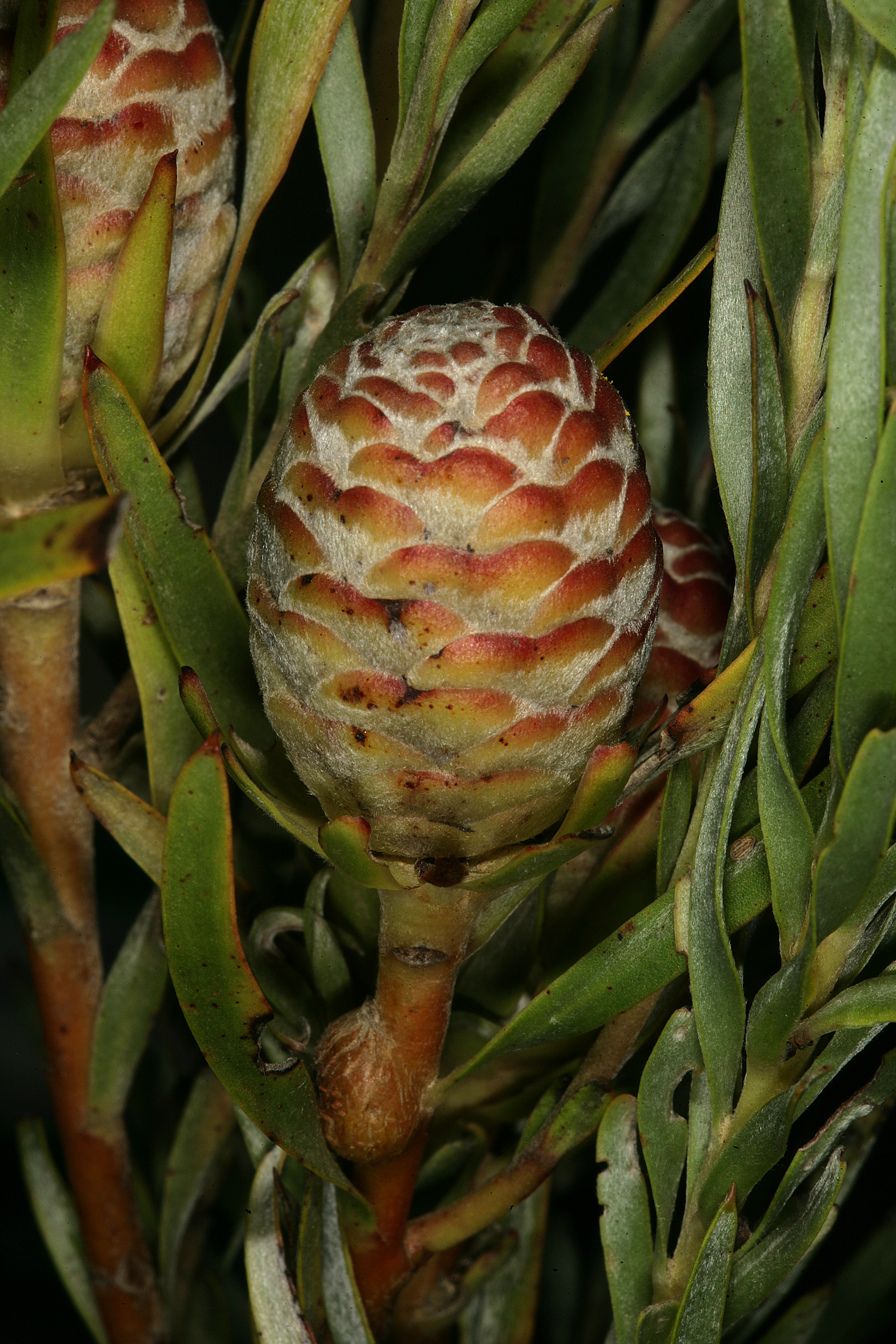

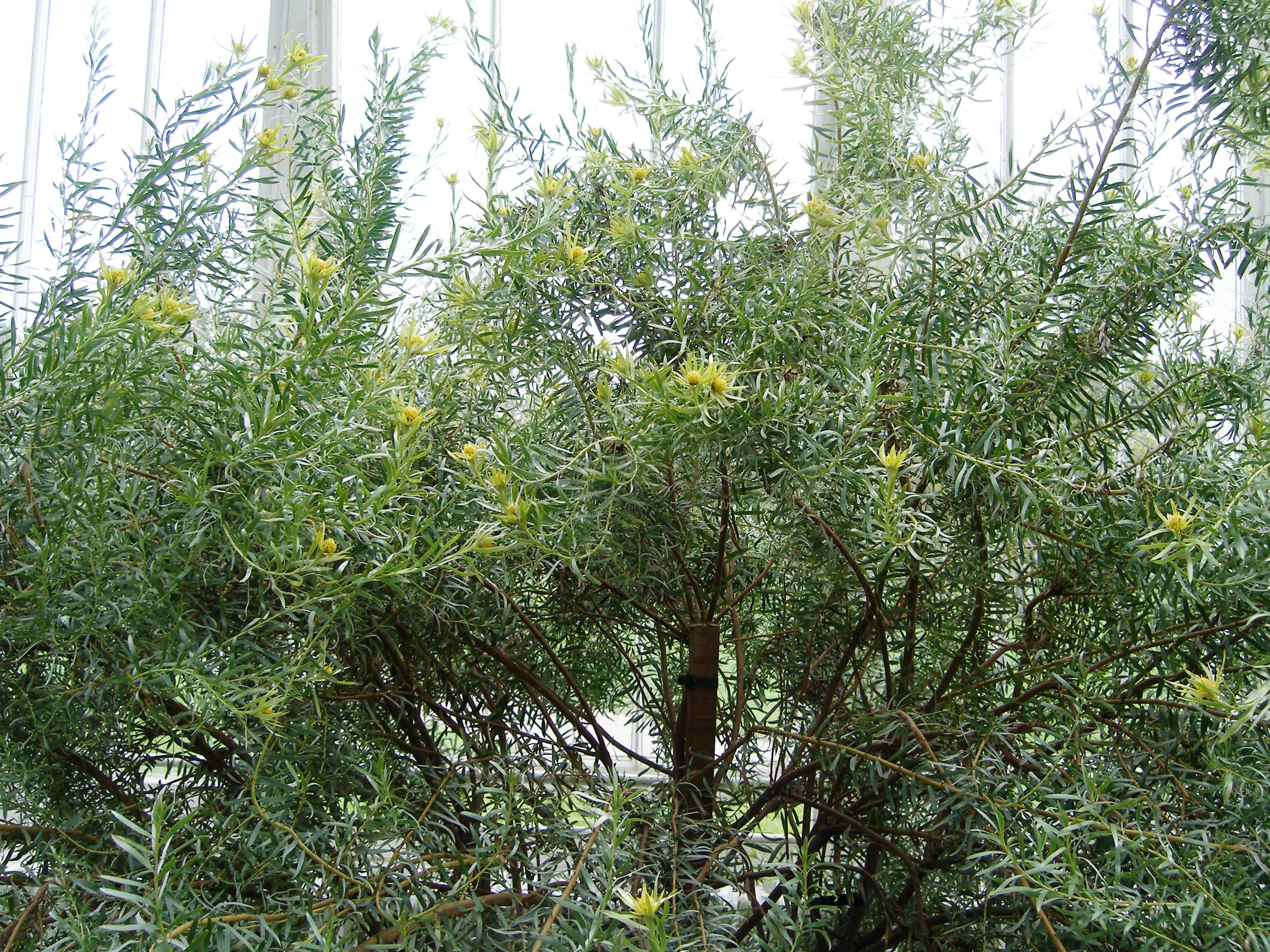

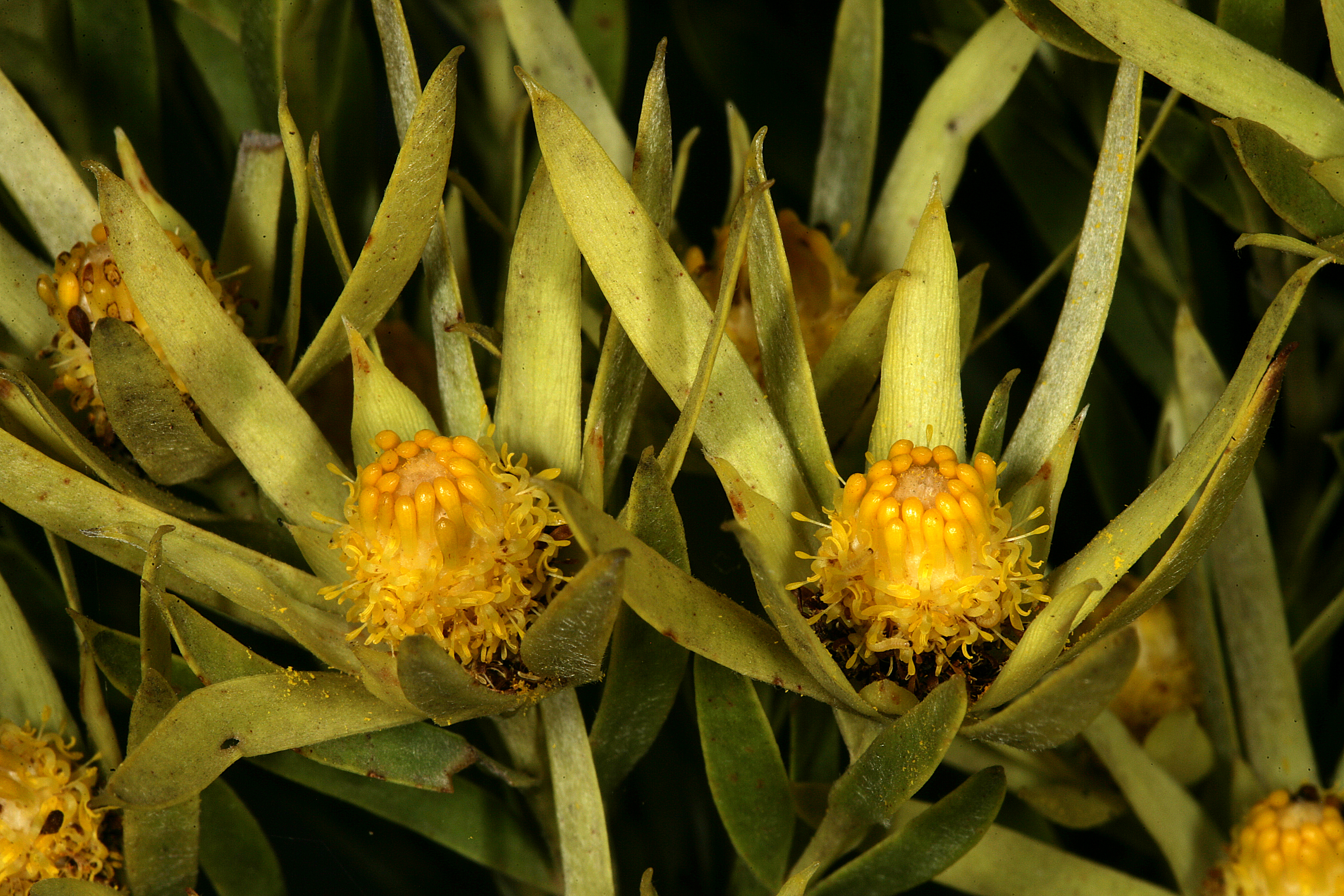

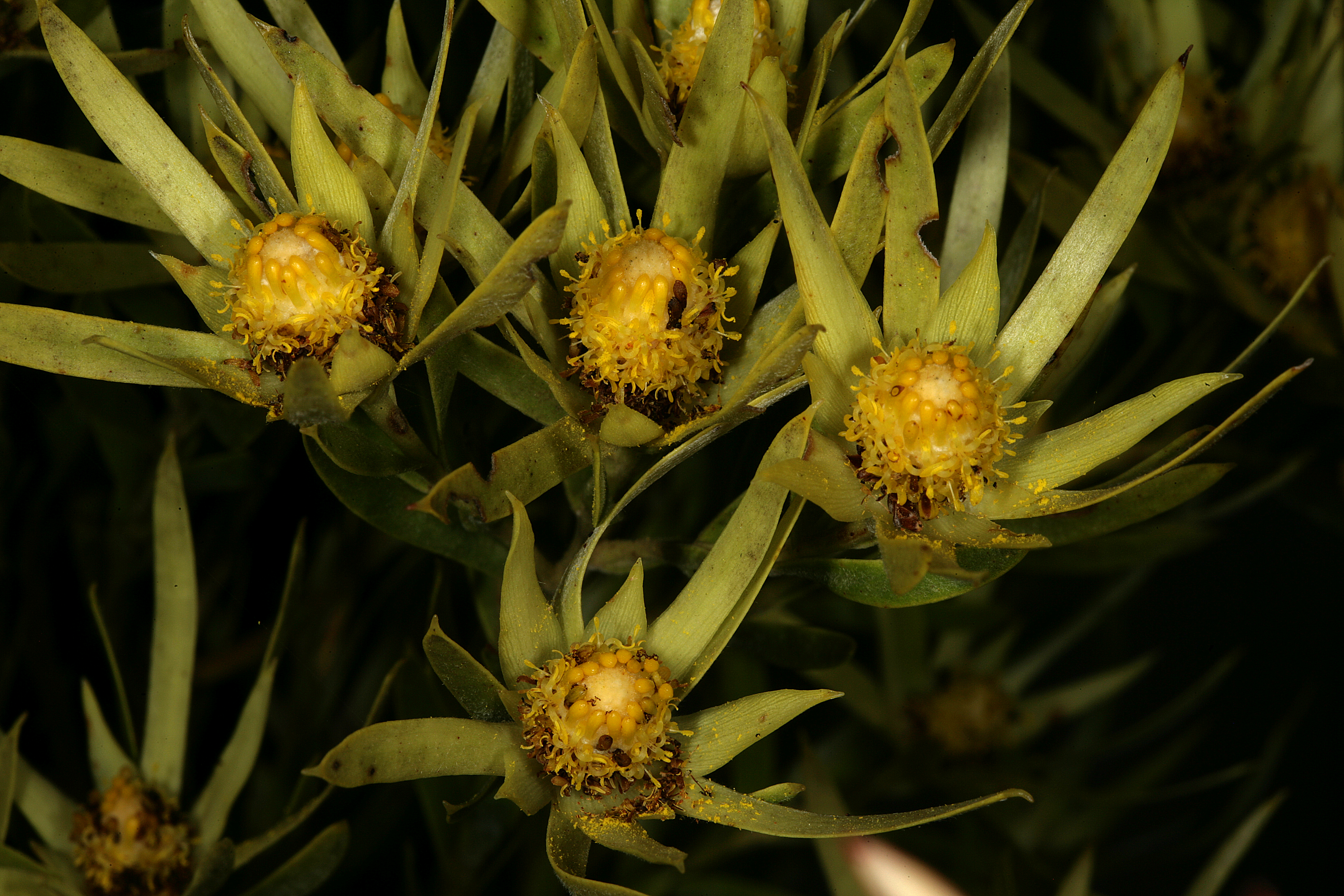
