= Aulax cancellata =

Conservation status
- Least Concern (IUCN 3.1)

Scientific classification
- Kingdom: Plantae
- Clade: Tracheophytes
- Clade: Angiosperms
- Clade: Eudicots
- Order: Proteales
- Family: Proteaceae
- Genus: Aulax
- Species: A. cancellata

Binomial name
- Aulax cancellata (L.) Druce

Flowering shrub from South Africa

Aulax cancellata, the channel-leaf featherbush, is a shrub that is native to the Western Cape and the Eastern Cape and belongs to the genus Aulax. This plant is widespread, it occurs on the Cape Peninsula, Hottentots-Holland Mountains to the Langeberg and Kouga Mountains, Swartberg and Kammanassie Mountains. The shrub grows upright with a single stem and grows up to 2.5 m tall.

The plant dies in a fire but the seeds survive. The plant is bisexual, male and female flowers grow on different plants. The plants bloom from November to February. A variety of insect species help pollinate the plants. Female flowers dry out and form a woody shell in which the seeds are formed and preserved. The plant grows in sandstone soil at altitudes of 0 to 1 200 m. In Afrikaans it is known as Geelveer.
