= Leucadendron foedum =

Conservation status
- Endangered (IUCN 3.1)

Scientific classification
- Kingdom: Plantae
- Clade: Tracheophytes
- Clade: Angiosperms
- Clade: Eudicots
- Order: Proteales
- Family: Proteaceae
- Genus: Leucadendron
- Species: L. foedum

Binomial name
- Leucadendron foedum I.Williams

Species of plant

Leucadendron foedum, the Hopefield conebush, is a flower-bearing shrub belonging to the genus Leucadendron and forms part of the fynbos. The plant is native to the Western Cape, South Africa, and occurs from Piketberg to Hopefield.

== Description ==
The shrub grows 2.5 m (8.2 ft) tall and flowers from August to October. The plant dies in a fire but the seeds survive. The seeds are stored in a toll on the female plant, fall to the ground after a fire and are spread by the wind. The plant is unisexual and there are separate plants with male and female flowers.

In Afrikaans, it is known as Hopefield-tolbos.
