= Serruria balanocephala =

Conservation status
- Least Concern (IUCN 3.1)

Scientific classification
- Kingdom: Plantae
- Clade: Tracheophytes
- Clade: Angiosperms
- Clade: Eudicots
- Order: Proteales
- Family: Proteaceae
- Genus: Serruria
- Species: S. balanocephala

Binomial name
- Serruria balanocephala Rourke

Species of flowering plant

Serruria balanocephala, the acorn spiderhead, is a flower-bearing shrub that belongs to the genus Serruria and forms part of the fynbos. The plant is native to the Western Cape and occurs on the Langeberg between Montagu and Swellendam. The shrub grows upright and grows 1.0 m long and flowers from late August to December.

The plant grows on the northern slopes at elevations of 600–650 m. The buds on which the pollen hangs are acorn-shaped, this is where the plant gets its name from.

In Afrikaans it is known as the akkerspinnekopbos.
