= Leucadendron thymifolium =

Conservation status
- Endangered (IUCN 3.1)

Scientific classification
- Kingdom: Plantae
- Clade: Tracheophytes
- Clade: Angiosperms
- Clade: Eudicots
- Order: Proteales
- Family: Proteaceae
- Genus: Leucadendron
- Species: L. thymifolium

Binomial name
- Leucadendron thymifolium (Salisb. ex Knight) I.Williams

Species of plant

Leucadendron thymifolium, the Malmesbury conebush, is a flower-bearing shrub belonging to the genus Leucadendron and forms part of the fynbos. The plant is native to the Western Cape, South Africa.

== Description ==
The shrub grows 2 m (6.6 ft) tall and bears flowers from August to September. Fire destroys the plant but the seeds survive. The seeds are stored in a toll on the female plant and fall to the ground, two months after the plant has flowered. The plant is unisexual and there are male and female plants. It is fertilized by insects.

In Afrikaans, it is known as Katsterttolbos.

== Distribution and habitat ==
The plant occurs on the Malmesbury Plain from Noordhoek to Klipheuwel. The plant grows mainly in sand or gravel over clay at heights of 100 m (330 ft).
