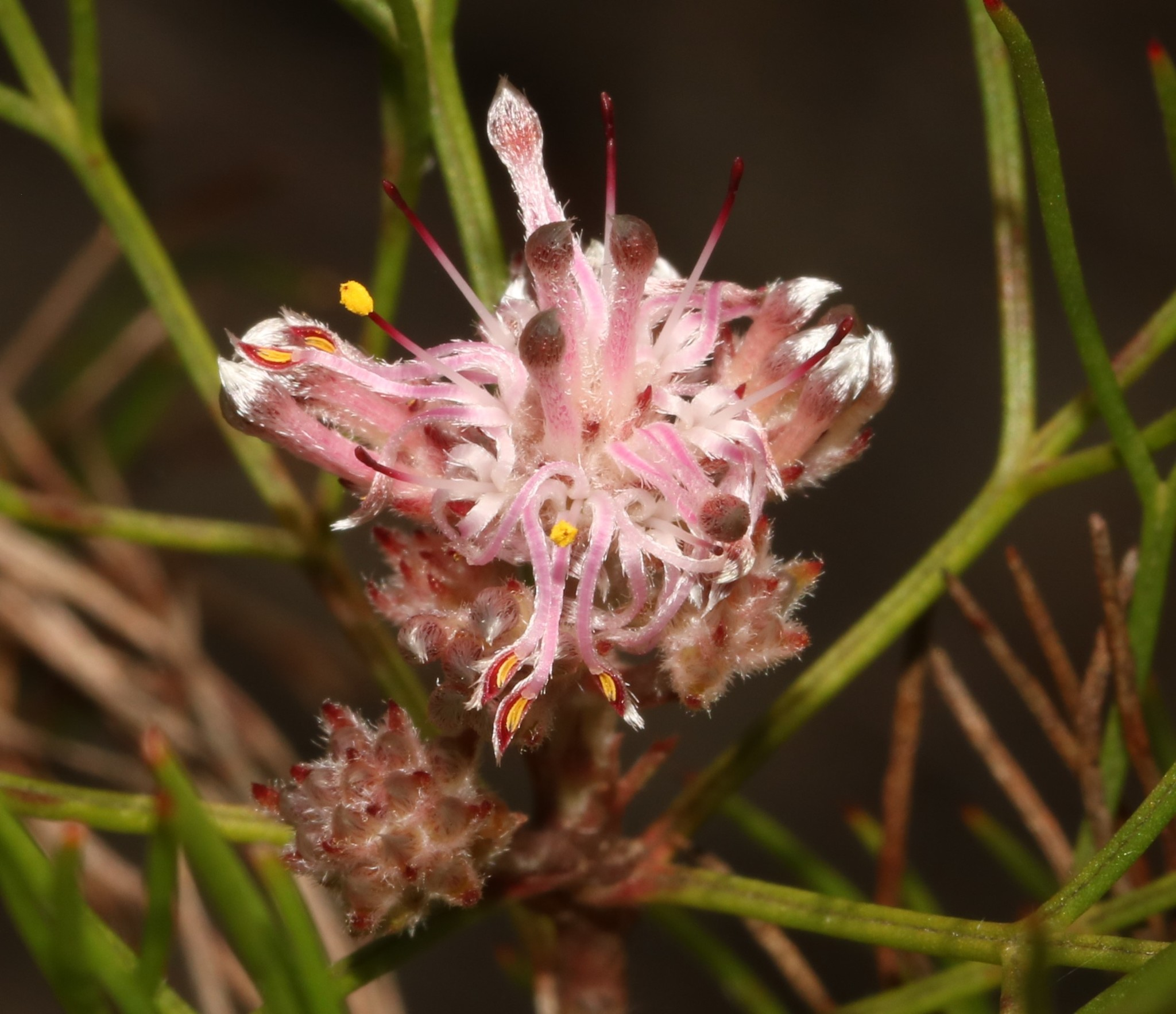

Conservation status
- Near Threatened (IUCN 3.1)

Scientific classification
- Kingdom: Plantae
- Clade: Tracheophytes
- Clade: Angiosperms
- Clade: Eudicots
- Order: Proteales
- Family: Proteaceae
- Genus: Serruria
- Species: S. inconspicua

Binomial name
- Serruria inconspicua L.Guthrie & T.M.Salter

= Serruria inconspicua =

Species of plant

Serruria inconspicua, the cryptic spiderhead, is a flowering shrub that belongs to the genus Serruria and forms part of the fynbos. The plant is endemic to the Western Cape, where it occurs from the Cape Peninsula to Houhoek. The shrub is flat and grows 20 cm high. The plant gets its name from the fact that the flowers are inconspicuous.

== Sources ==
- REDLIST Sanbi
- Biodiversityexplorer
- Protea Atlas
- Plants of the World Online
