= Serruria confragosa =

Conservation status
- Least Concern (IUCN 3.1)

Scientific classification
- Kingdom: Plantae
- Clade: Tracheophytes
- Clade: Angiosperms
- Clade: Eudicots
- Order: Proteales
- Family: Proteaceae
- Genus: Serruria
- Species: S. confragosa

Binomial name
- Serruria confragosa Rourke

Species of flowering plant

Serruria confragosa, the wavy spiderhead, is a flower-bearing shrub that belongs to the genus Serruria and forms part of the fynbos. The plant is native to the Western Cape and occurs in the Koue Bokkeveld Mountains and Great Winterhoek Mountains. The shrub grows upright with few branches and grows 1.0 m tall, and flowers from September to November.

Fire destroys the plant but the seeds survive. Two months after flowering, the fruit falls off and ants disperse the seeds. They store the seeds in their nests. The plant is unisexual. Pollination takes place through the action of insects. The plant grows on dry, sandstone soils at altitudes of 1000 to 1250 m.

In Afrikaans it is known as the Golwende spinnekopbos.
