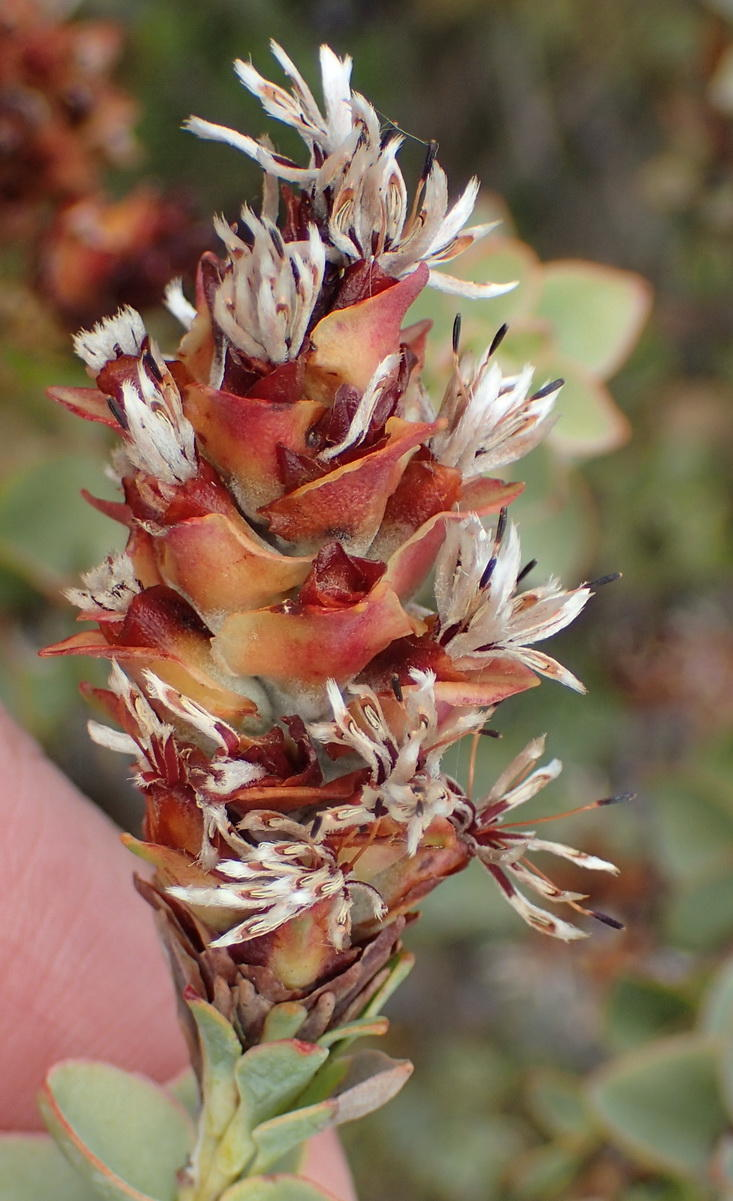

Conservation status
- Least Concern (IUCN 3.1).

Scientific classification
- Kingdom: Plantae
- Clade: Tracheophytes
- Clade: Angiosperms
- Clade: Eudicots
- Order: Proteales
- Family: Proteaceae
- Genus: Paranomus
- Species: P. roodebergensis

Binomial name
- Paranomus roodebergensis (Compton) Levyns

Synonyms
- Nivenia roodebergensis Compton

= Paranomus roodebergensis =

Species of flowering plant

Paranomus roodebergensis, also known as the honey-scented sceptre, is a flower-bearing shrub that belongs to the genus Paranomus and forms part of the fynbos. The plant is native to the Western Cape, South Africa.

== Description ==
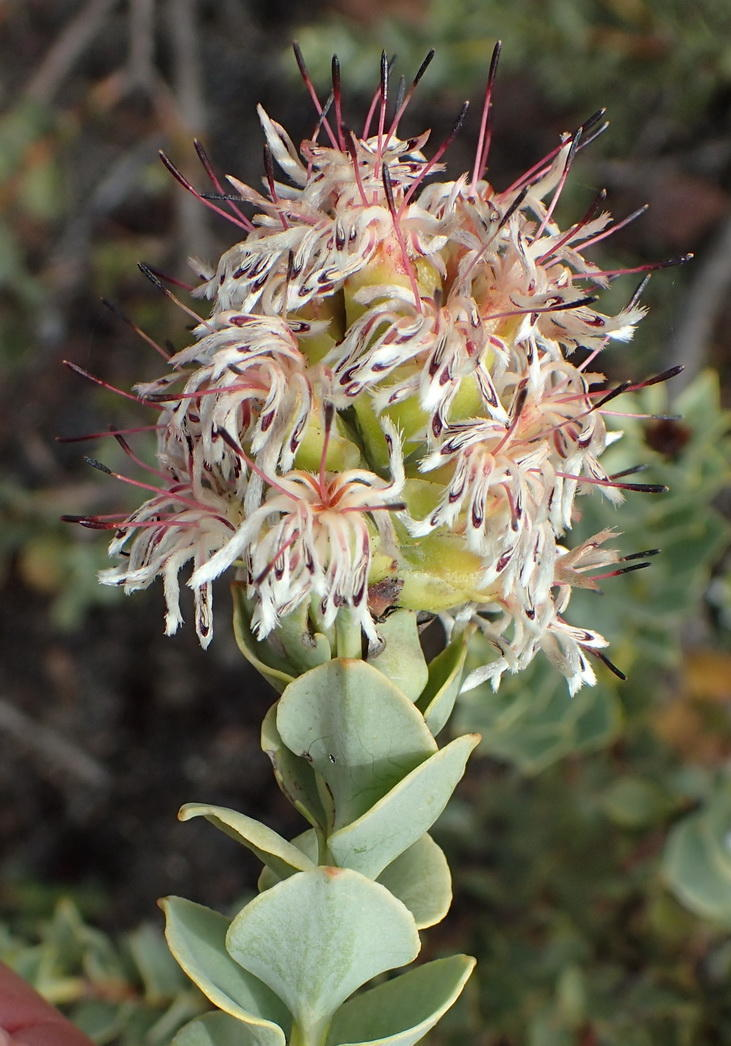

The shrub grows up to 2.5 m (8 ft 2 in) in height and flowers from August to October. Fire destroys the plant but the seeds survive. The plant is bisexual and pollinated by insects. The fruit ripens, two months after flowering, and the seeds fall to the ground where they are spread by ants.

In Afrikaans, it is known as heuningreuksepter. The tree's national number is 72.6.

== Distribution and habitat ==
The plant occurs in the Rooiberg, Huis River Pass, and Touwsberg. It grows in sandstone sand at altitudes of 600–1,300 m (2,000–4,300 ft).

== Gallery ==
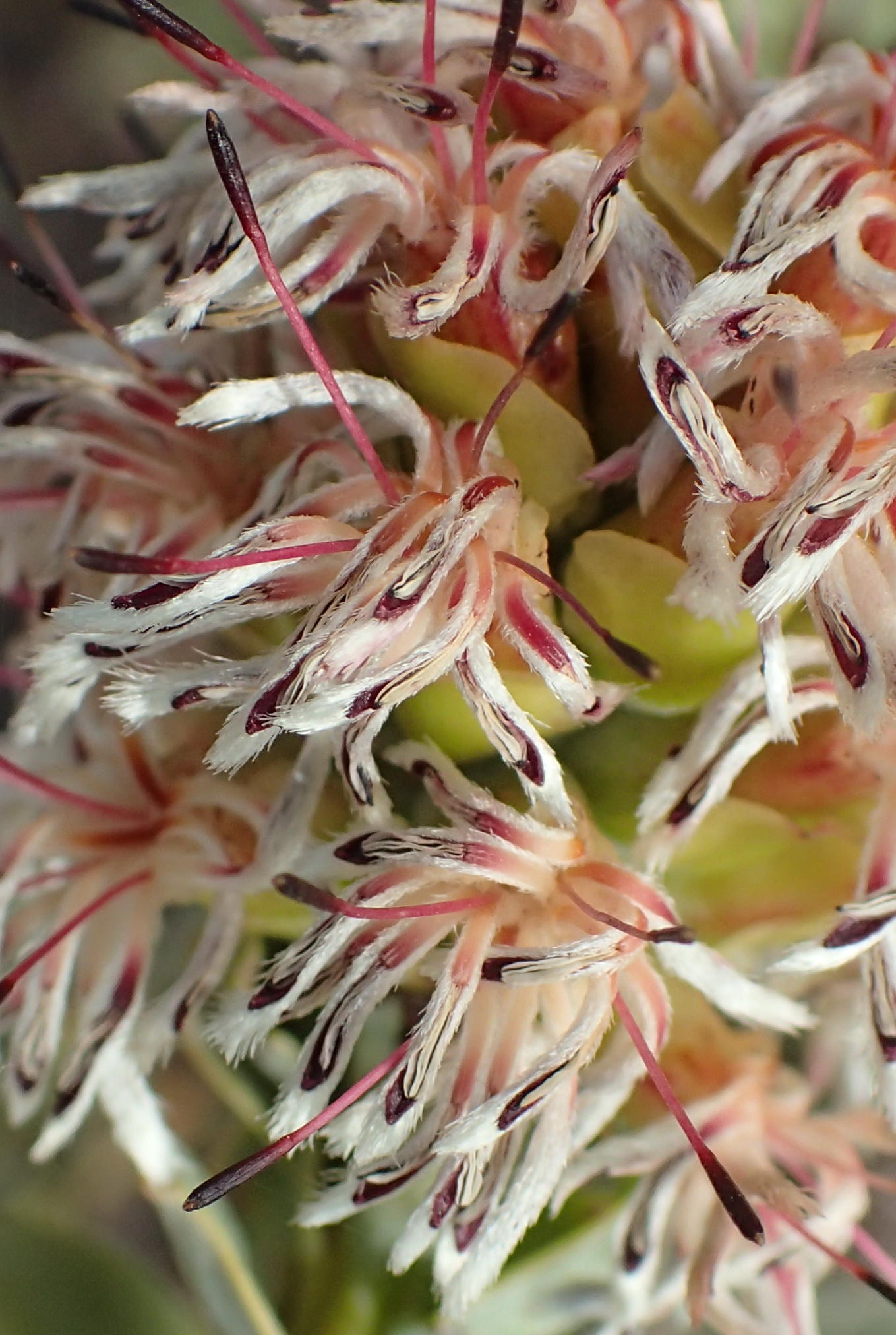

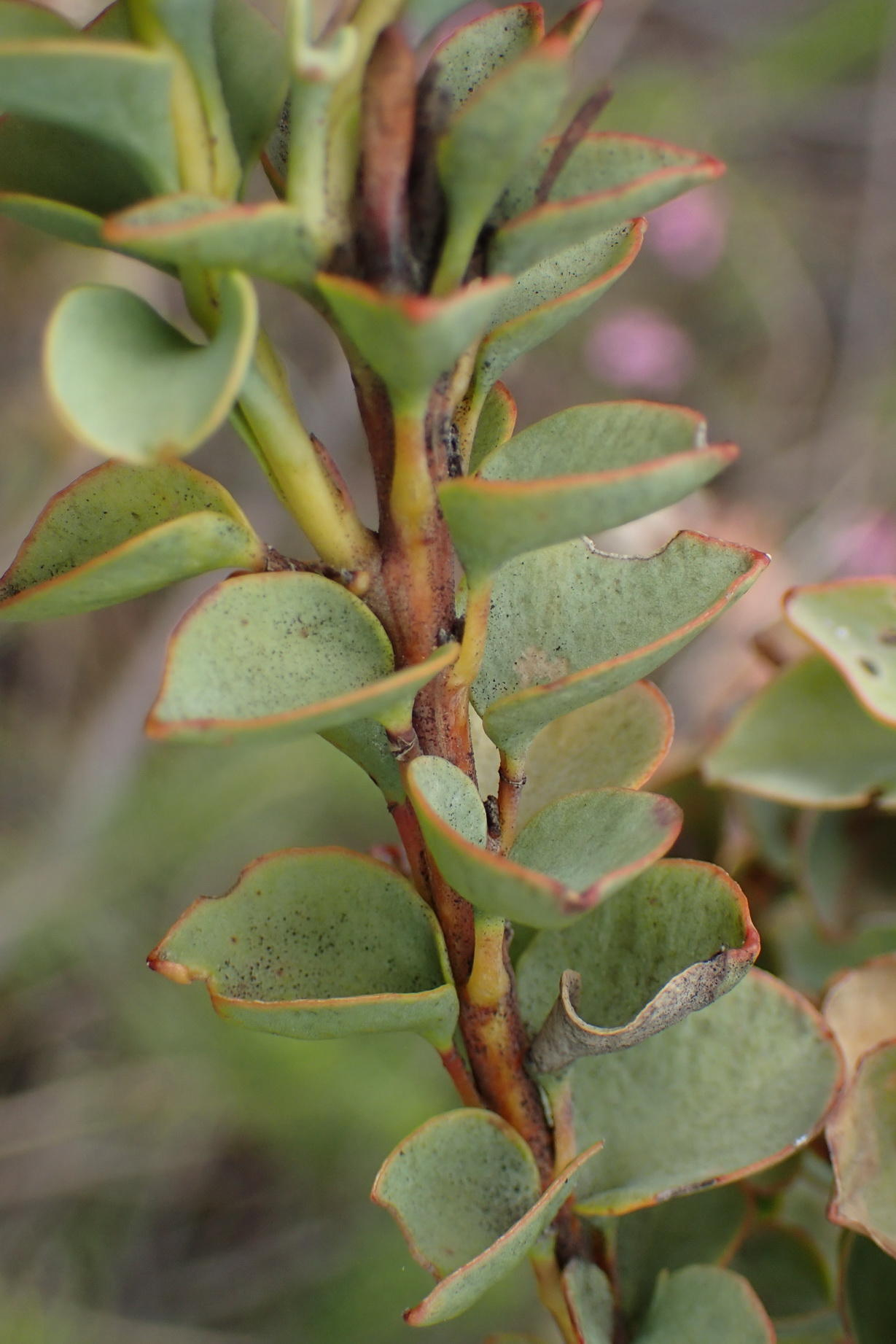

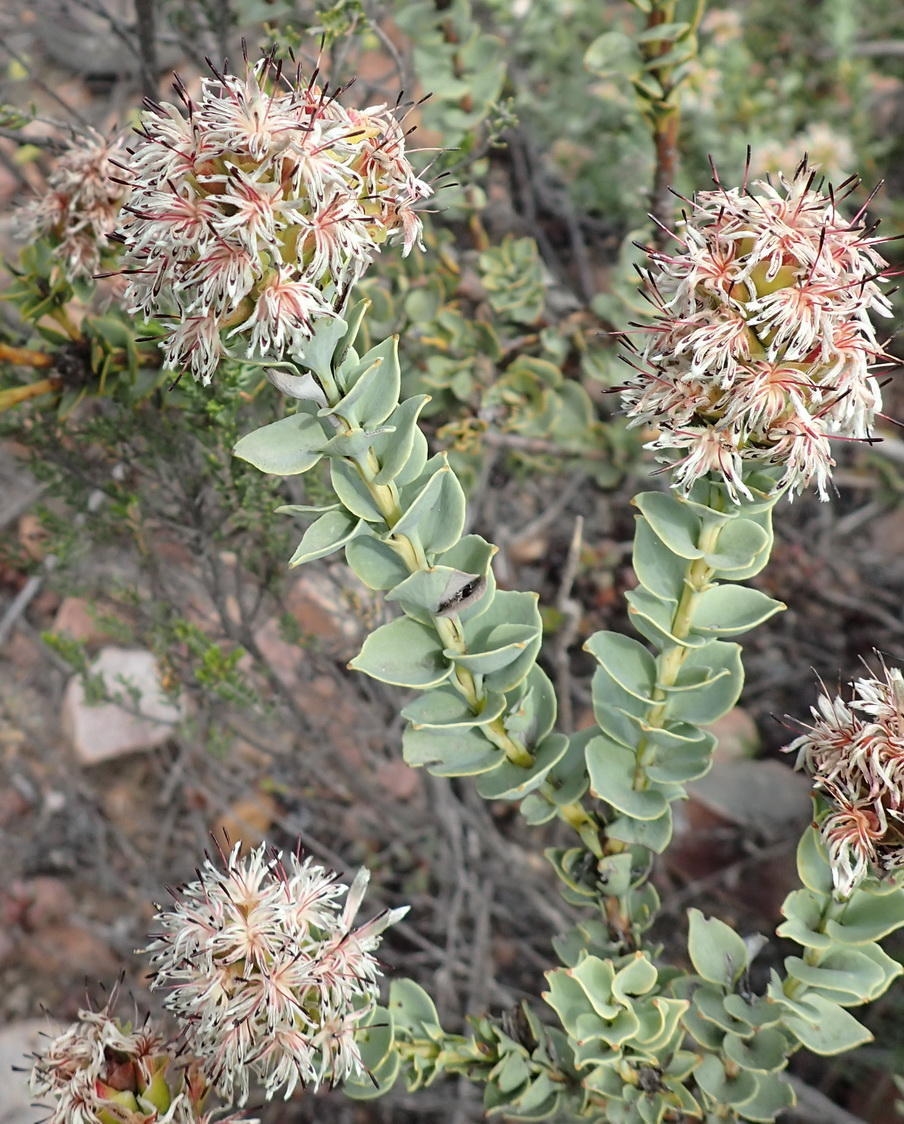
