= Paranomus capitatus =

Conservation status
- Least Concern (IUCN 3.1)

Scientific classification
- Kingdom: Plantae
- Clade: Tracheophytes
- Clade: Angiosperms
- Clade: Eudicots
- Order: Proteales
- Family: Proteaceae
- Genus: Paranomus
- Species: P. capitatus

Binomial name
- Paranomus capitatus (R.Br.) Kuntze

Synonyms
- Nivenia capitata R.Br.; Protea capitata (R.Br.) Poir.; Serruria brevifolia E.Phillips & Hutch.

Species of flowering plant

Paranomus capitatus, the fine-leaf sceptre, is a flower-bearing shrub that belongs to the genus Paranomus and forms part of the fynbos. The plant is native to the Western Cape where it occurs in the Du Toits Mountains south of Du Toitskloof Pass to the northern slopes of the Riviersonderend Mountains.

The shrub grows up to 50 cm tall and flowers mainly from July to October. Fire destroys the plant but the seeds survive. The plant is bisexual and pollination takes place through the action of insects. The fruit ripens, two months after flowering, and the seeds fall to the ground where they are spread by ants. The plant grows in mountainous sandstone fynbos at altitudes of 400 – 1500 m.

In Afrikaans, it is known as fynblaarsepter.
