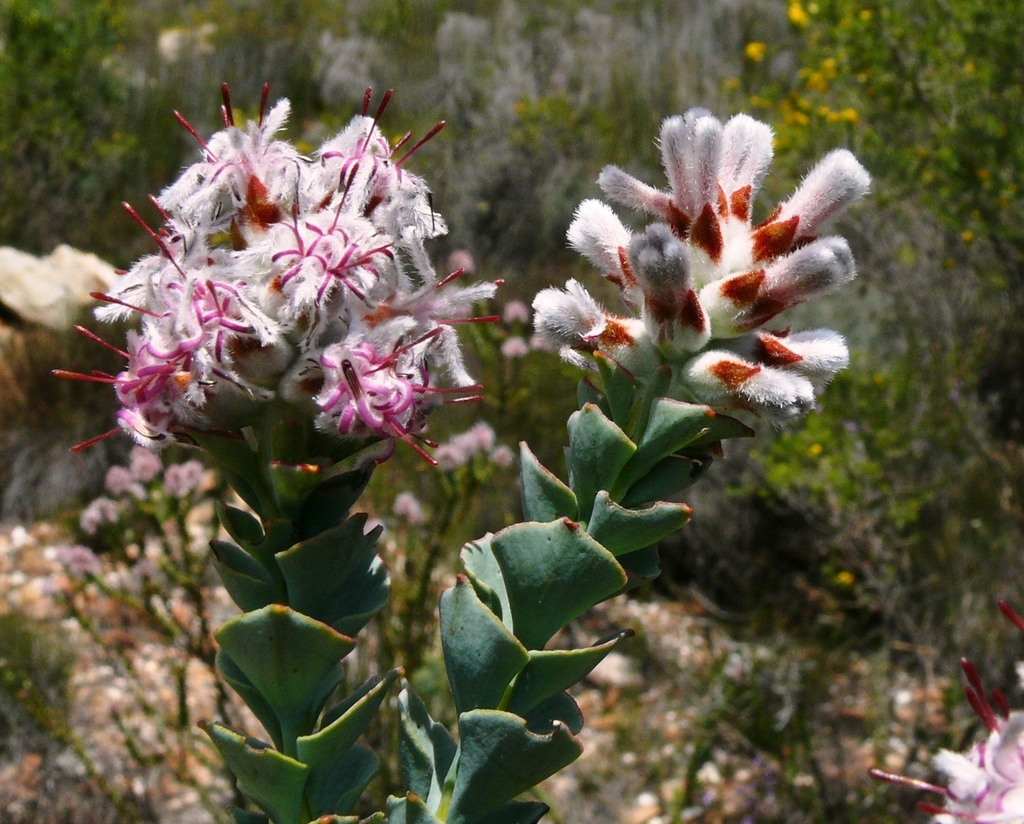

Conservation status
- Least Concern (IUCN 3.1)

Scientific classification
- Kingdom: Plantae
- Clade: Tracheophytes
- Clade: Angiosperms
- Clade: Eudicots
- Order: Proteales
- Family: Proteaceae
- Genus: Paranomus
- Species: P. spathulatus

Binomial name
- Paranomus spathulatus (Thunb.) Kuntze

Synonyms
- Leucadendron spathulatum (Thunb.) Kuntze; Nivenia marginata R.Br.; Nivenia muirii E.Phillips & Hutch.; Nivenia spathulata R.Br.; Paranomus flabellifer Knight; Paranomus marginatus (R.Br.) Kuntze; Protea spathulata Thunb.

= Paranomus spathulatus =

Species of flowering plant

Paranomus spathulatus, the Langeberg sceptre, is a flower-bearing shrub that belongs to the genus Paranomus and forms part of the fynbos. The plant is native to the Western Cape, South Africa.

== Description ==
The shrub grows up to 2.5 m (8.2 ft) tall and flowers from May to December. Sometimes fire destroys the plant and the seeds survive but sometimes the plant sprouts again. The plant is bisexual and is pollinated by insects. The fruit ripens two months after flowering, and the seeds fall to the ground where they are spread by ants.

In Afrikaans, it is known as langebergsepter.

== Distribution and habitat ==
The plant occurs in the Langeberg from Tradouws Pass to Garcia's Pass. It grows in sandstone sand at altitudes of 300–600 m (980–1,970 ft).
