= Paranomus lagopus =

Conservation status
- Near Threatened (IUCN 3.1)

Scientific classification
- Kingdom: Plantae
- Clade: Tracheophytes
- Clade: Angiosperms
- Clade: Eudicots
- Order: Proteales
- Family: Proteaceae
- Genus: Paranomus
- Species: P. lagopus

Binomial name
- Paranomus lagopus (Thunb.) Salisb.

Species of plant

Paranomus lagopus, the rabbit-paw sceptre, is a flower-bearing shrub that belongs to the genus Paranomus and forms part of the fynbos. The plant is native to the Western Cape where it occurs in the Koue Bokkeveld Mountains, Groot-Winterhoek Mountains and Elandskloof Mountain.

The shrub grows to 1.3 m tall and flowers from September to November. Fire destroys the plant but the seeds survive. The plant is bisexual and pollination takes place through the action of insects. The fruit ripens, two months after flowering, and the seeds fall to the ground where they are spread by ants. The plant grows in sandstone sandy heights of 200 – 1100 m.
