= Paranomus esterhuyseniae =

Conservation status
- Near Threatened (IUCN 3.1)

Scientific classification
- Kingdom: Plantae
- Clade: Tracheophytes
- Clade: Angiosperms
- Clade: Eudicots
- Order: Proteales
- Family: Proteaceae
- Genus: Paranomus
- Species: P. esterhuyseniae

Binomial name
- Paranomus esterhuyseniae Levyns

Species of flowering plant

Paranomus esterhuyseniae, the Kouga sceptre, is a flower-bearing shrub that belongs to the genus Paranomus and forms part of the fynbos. The plant is native to the Western Cape where it occurs in the Kouga Mountains and Outeniqua Mountains.

The shrub grows up to 70 cm tall and flowers mainly from August to November. Fire destroys the plant but the seeds survive. The plant is bisexual and pollination takes place through the action of insects. The fruit ripens two months after flowering, and the seeds fall to the ground where they are spread by ants. The plant grows in sandstone soil at altitudes of 900 - 1400 m.

In Afrikaans it is known as Kougasepter.
