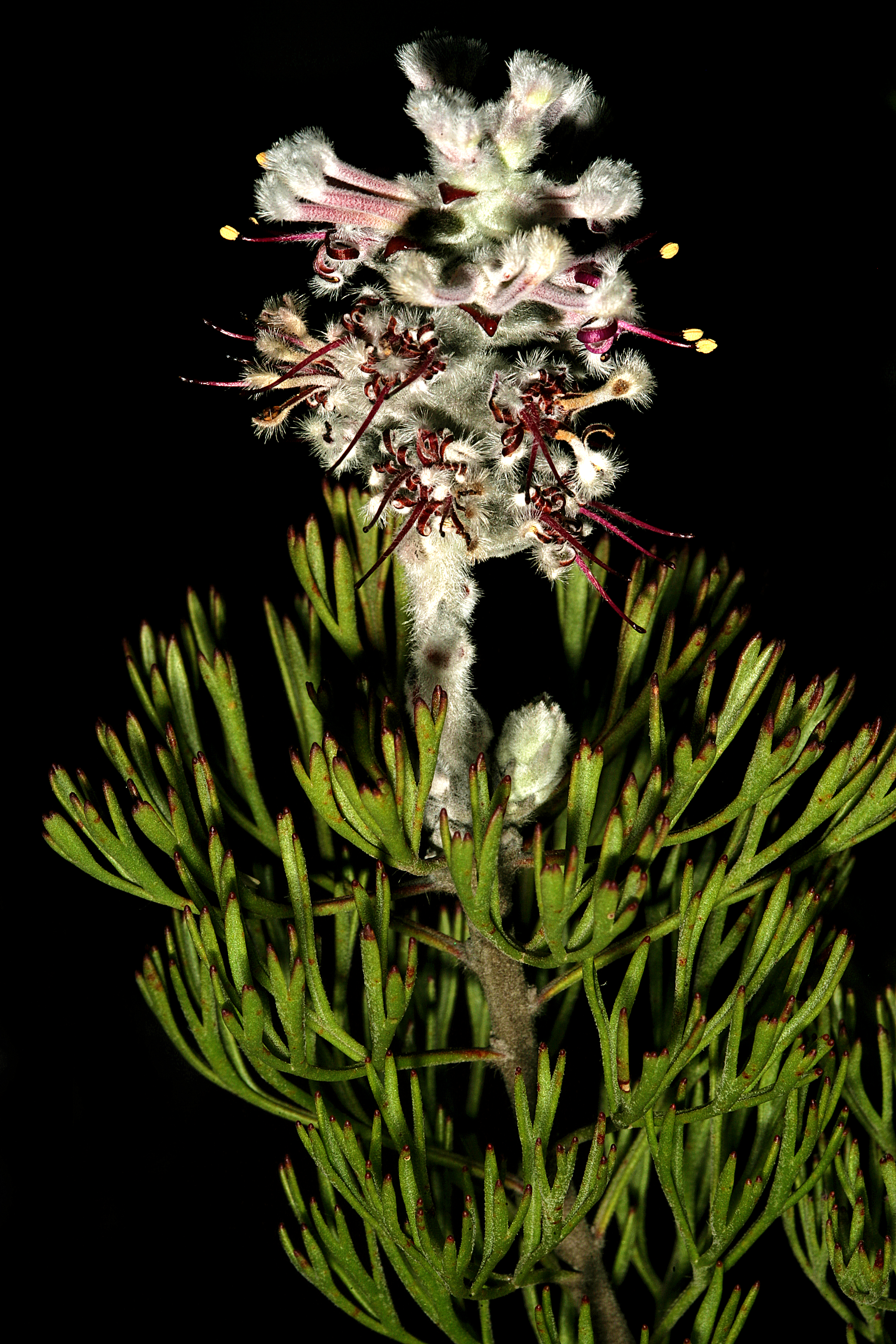

Conservation status
- Near Threatened (IUCN 3.1)

Scientific classification
- Kingdom: Plantae
- Clade: Tracheophytes
- Clade: Angiosperms
- Clade: Eudicots
- Order: Proteales
- Family: Proteaceae
- Genus: Paranomus
- Species: P. bolusii

Binomial name
- Paranomus bolusii (Gand.) Levyns

Synonyms
- Nivenia bolusii Gand.; Nivenia crithmifolia R.Br.; Paranomus crithmifolius Kuntze; Protea crithmifolia Poir.

= Paranomus bolusii =

Species of flowering plant

Paranomus bolusii, the Overberg sceptre or Viking sceptre, is a flower-bearing shrub that belongs to the genus Paranomus and forms part of the fynbos. The plant is native to the Western Cape, South Africa.

== Description ==
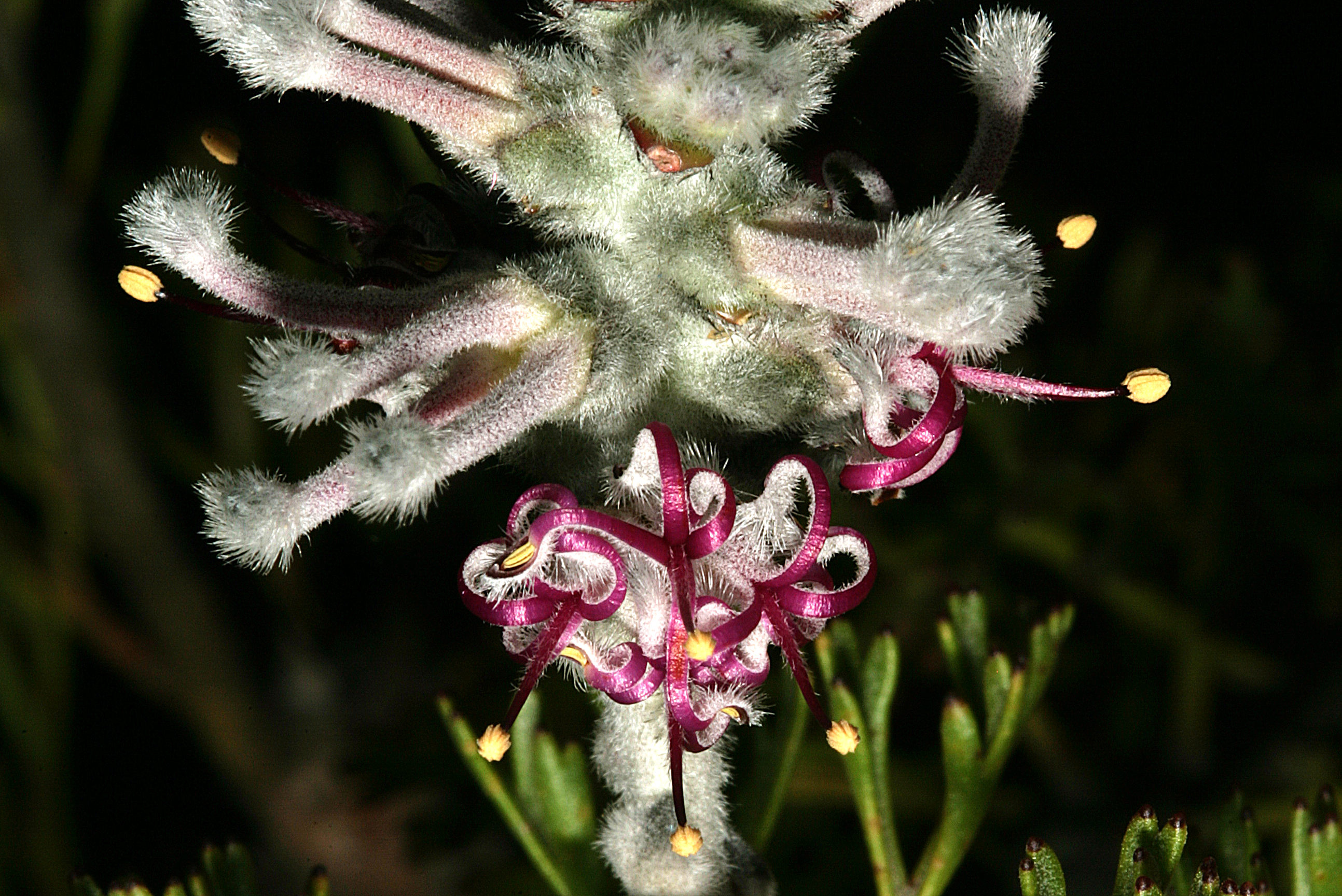
A close-up of the plant.

The shrub grows up to 1.0 m (3.3 ft) tall and flowers mainly from June to November. Fire destroys the plant but the seeds survive. The plant is bisexual and pollinated by insects. The fruit ripens two months after the plant has flowered and the seeds fall to the ground where they are spread by ants.

In Afrikaans, it is known as Overbergsepter.

== Distribution and habitat ==
The plant occurs on the Groenlandberg, Riviersonderendberge, Babilonstoringberge and Kleinrivierberge, Caledon, and the Swartberg. The plant grows in sandstone and Cederberg shale at altitudes of 150–700 m (490–2,300 ft).
