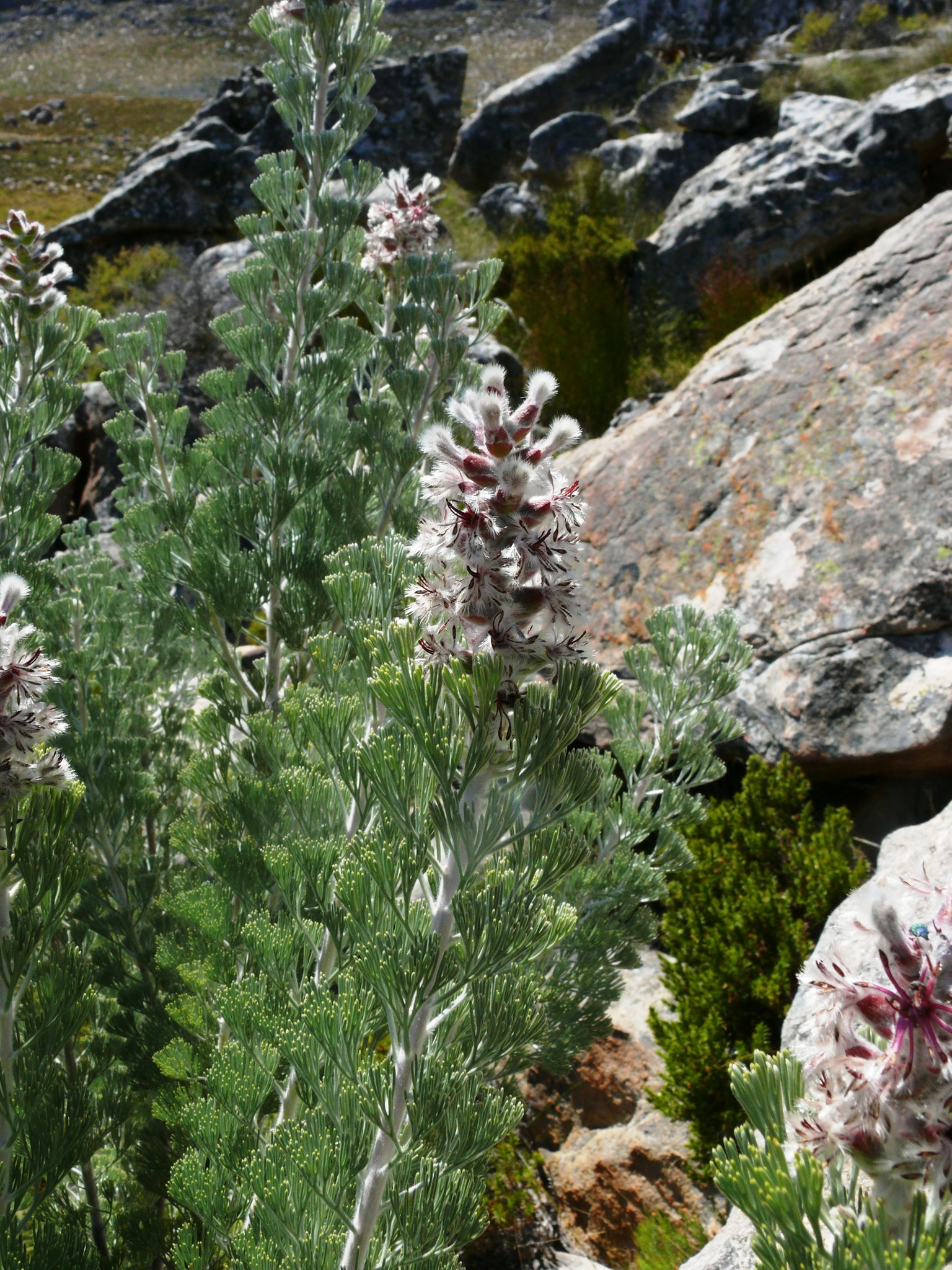

Conservation status
- Near Threatened (IUCN 3.1)

Scientific classification
- Kingdom: Plantae
- Clade: Tracheophytes
- Clade: Angiosperms
- Clade: Eudicots
- Order: Proteales
- Family: Proteaceae
- Genus: Paranomus
- Species: P. tomentosus

Binomial name
- Paranomus tomentosus (E.Phillips & Hutch.) N.E.Br.

= Paranomus tomentosus =

Species of plant

Paranomus tomentosus, the hairy-leaf tree sceptre, is a flower-bearing shrub that belongs to the genus Proteaceae. It is part of the South African fynbos vegetation type. The plant is native to the Western Cape, South Africa.

== Description ==
The shrub grows up to 3 m (9.8 ft) tall and is the largest species of the genus. The tree blooms from September to November. Fire destroys the plant but the seeds survive. The plant is bisexual and pollinated by insects. The fruit ripens two months after flowering, and the seeds fall to the ground where they are spread by ants.

In Afrikaans, it is known as Harige septerboom. The shrub's national number is 72.5.

== Distribution and habitat ==
The plant occurs in the Cederberg Mountains. It grows in rocky areas in sandstone fynbos at altitudes of 1,000–1,600 m (3,300–5,200 ft).

== Gallery ==
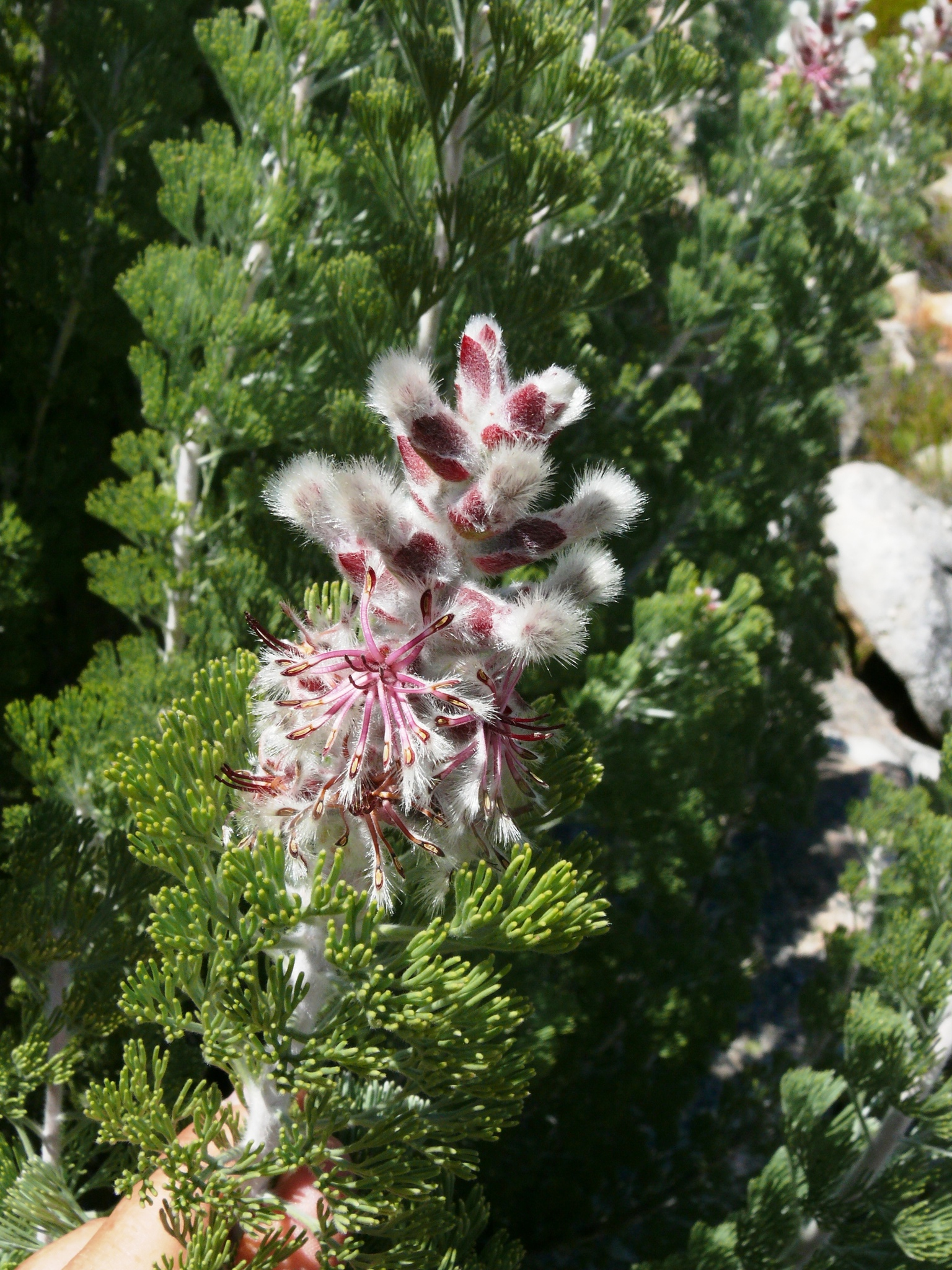

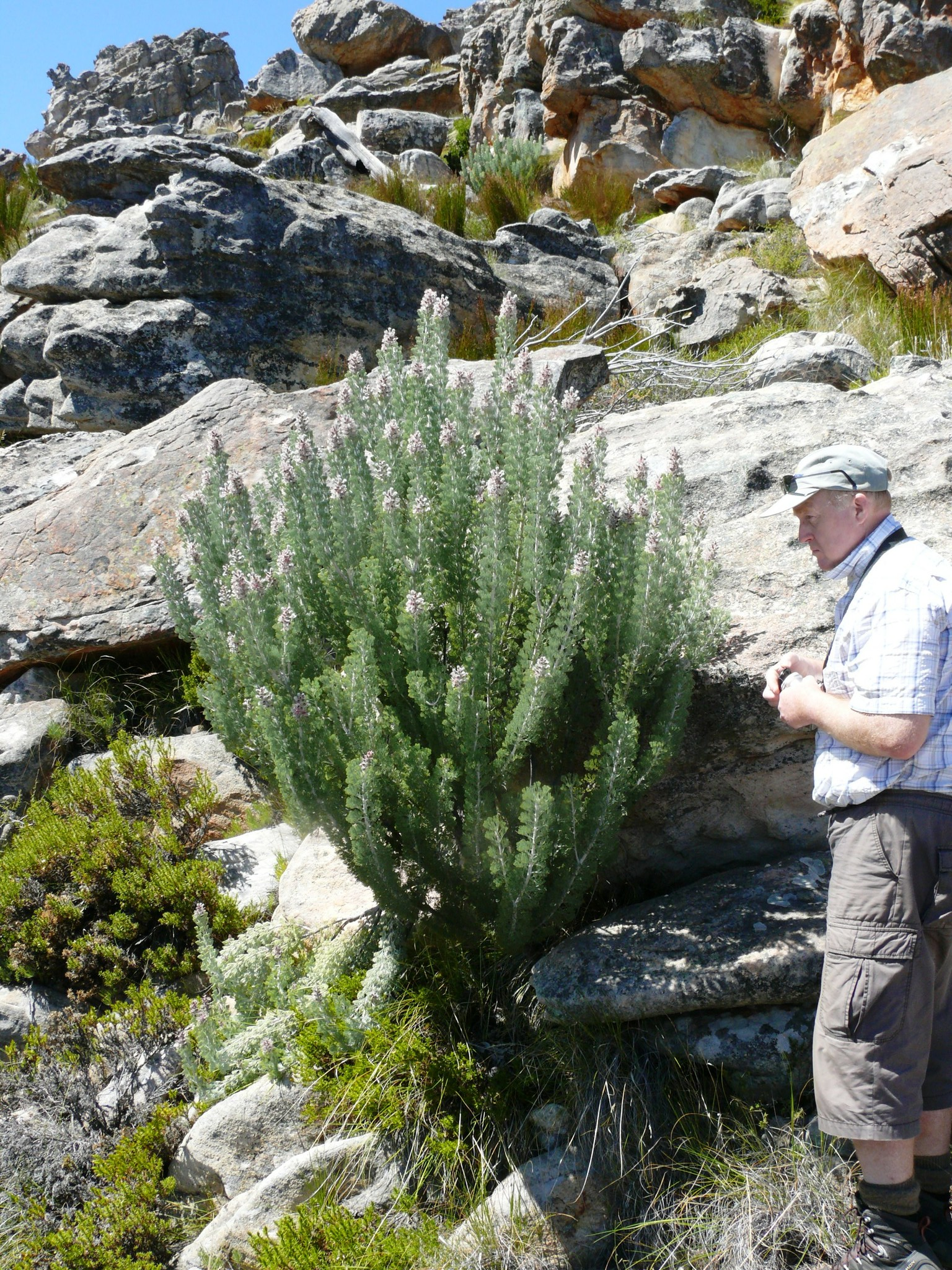
