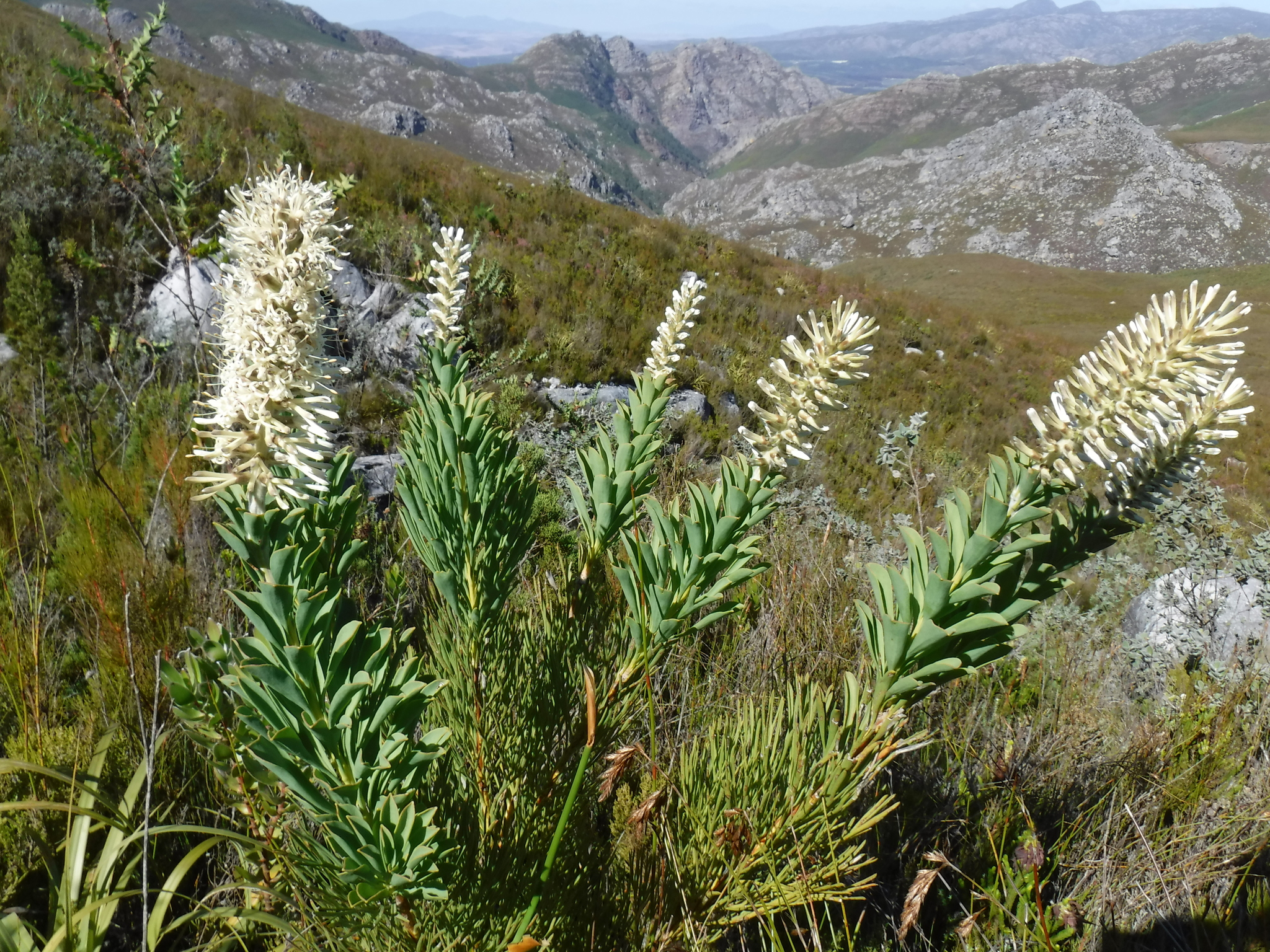

Conservation status
- Least Concern (IUCN 3.1)

Scientific classification
- Kingdom: Plantae
- Clade: Tracheophytes
- Clade: Angiosperms
- Clade: Eudicots
- Order: Proteales
- Family: Proteaceae
- Genus: Paranomus
- Species: P. sceptrum-gustavianus

Binomial name
- Paranomus sceptrum-gustavianus (Sparrm.) Hyl.

Synonyms
- Leucospermum spathulatum Drège ex Meisn.; Nivenia alopecuroides Lam. ex St.-Lag.; Nivenia sceptrum (Thunb.) R.Br.; Nivenia sceptrum-gustavianum (Sparrm.) Druce; Paranomus sceptridormis Knight; Paranomus sceptrum (R.Br.) Kuntze; Protea alopecuroides Lam.; Protea sceptrum Thunb.; Protea sceptrum-gustavianum Sparrm.

= Paranomus sceptrum-gustavianus =

Species of plant

Paranomus sceptrum-gustavianus, the King Gustav's sceptre, is a flowering shrub that belongs to the genus Paranomus and forms part of the fynbos. The plant is native to the Western Cape, South Africa.

== Description ==
The shrub grows to 1.8 m (5.9 ft) tall. The lower leaves of the shrub are finely divided and the upper one is spoon-shaped or diamond-shaped. The flowers are clustered in small heads, 16–22 mm (0.63–0.87 in) long and in cylindrical veins. The shrub blooms from July to March. Fire destroys the plant but the seeds survive. The plant is bisexual and pollination takes place through the action of insects. The fruit ripens two months after the plant has flowered and the seeds fall to the ground where they are spread by ants.

== Distribution and habitat ==
The plant occurs from the Hottentots Holland Mountains to the western Langeberg as well as the Elim plains. The plant grows on sandstone slopes at altitudes of 150–500 mm (5.9–19.7 in).

== Gallery ==
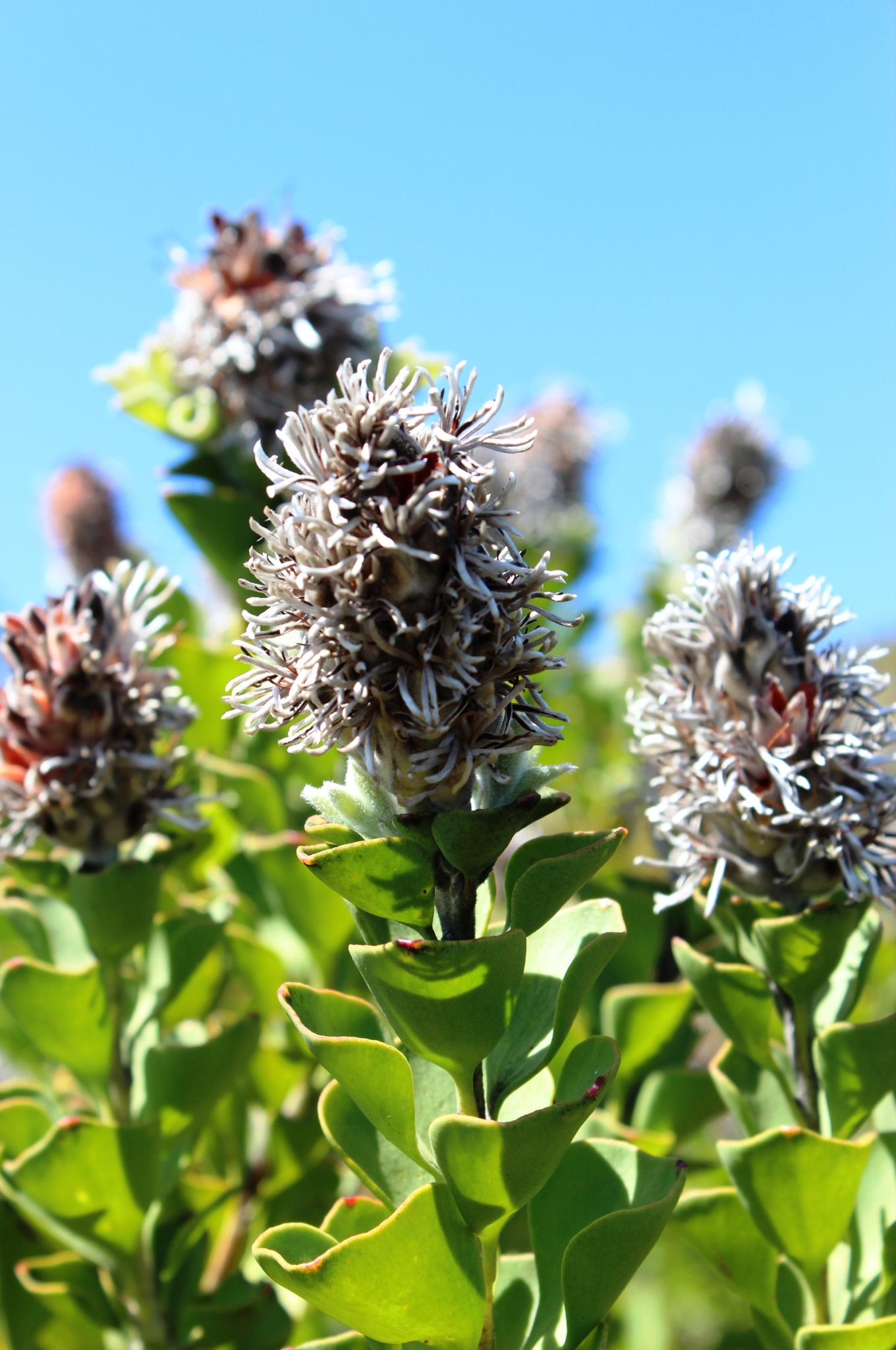

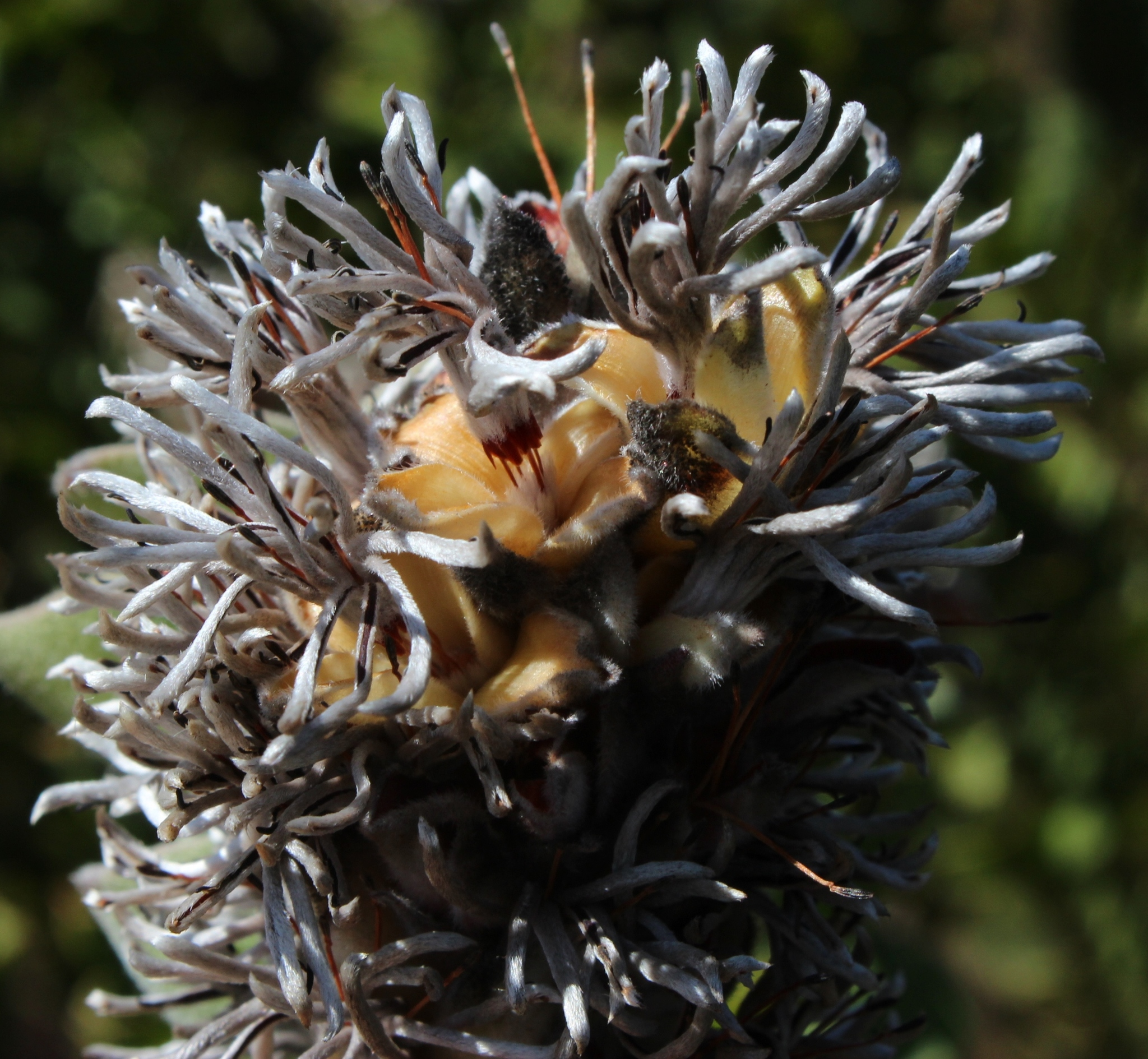

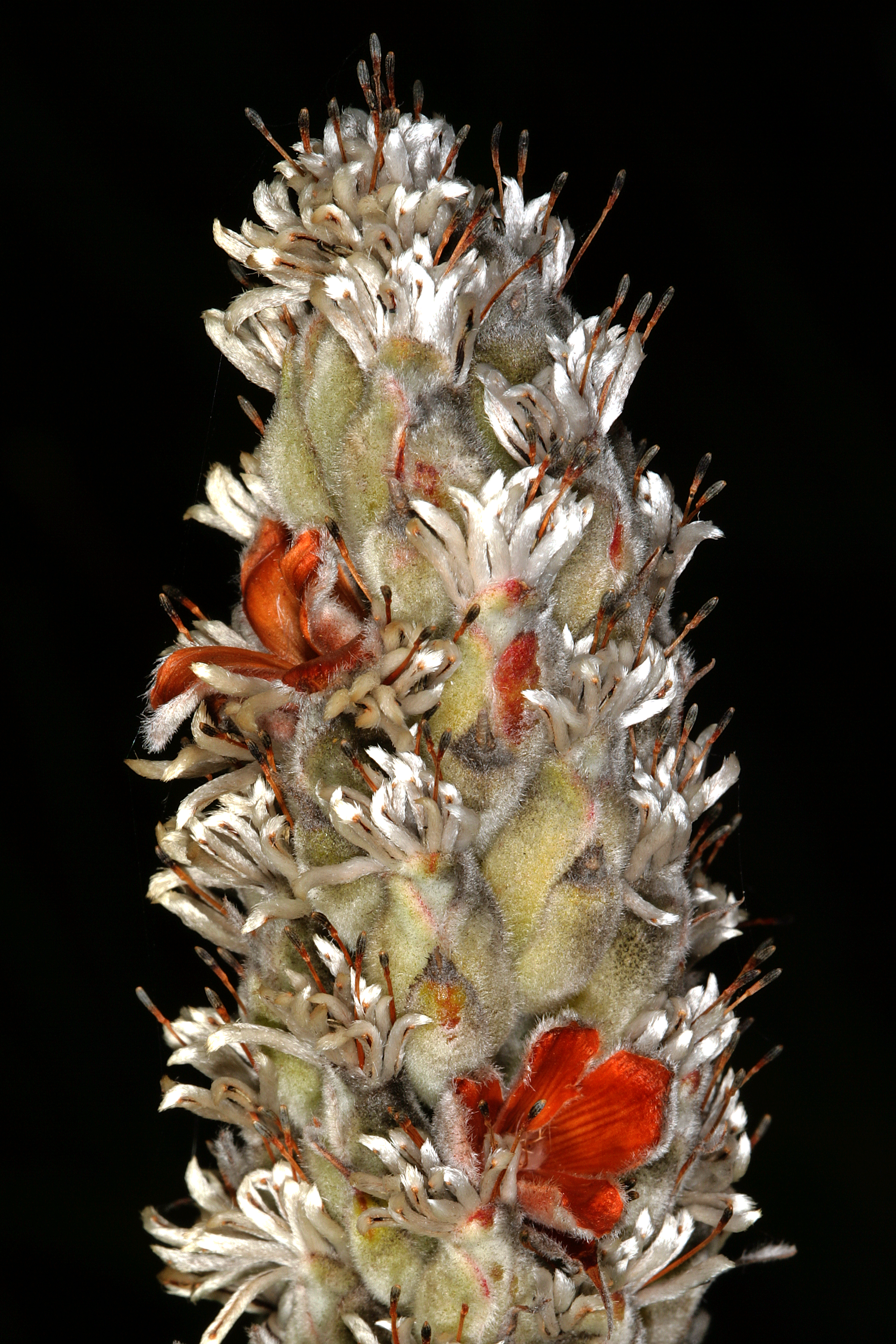

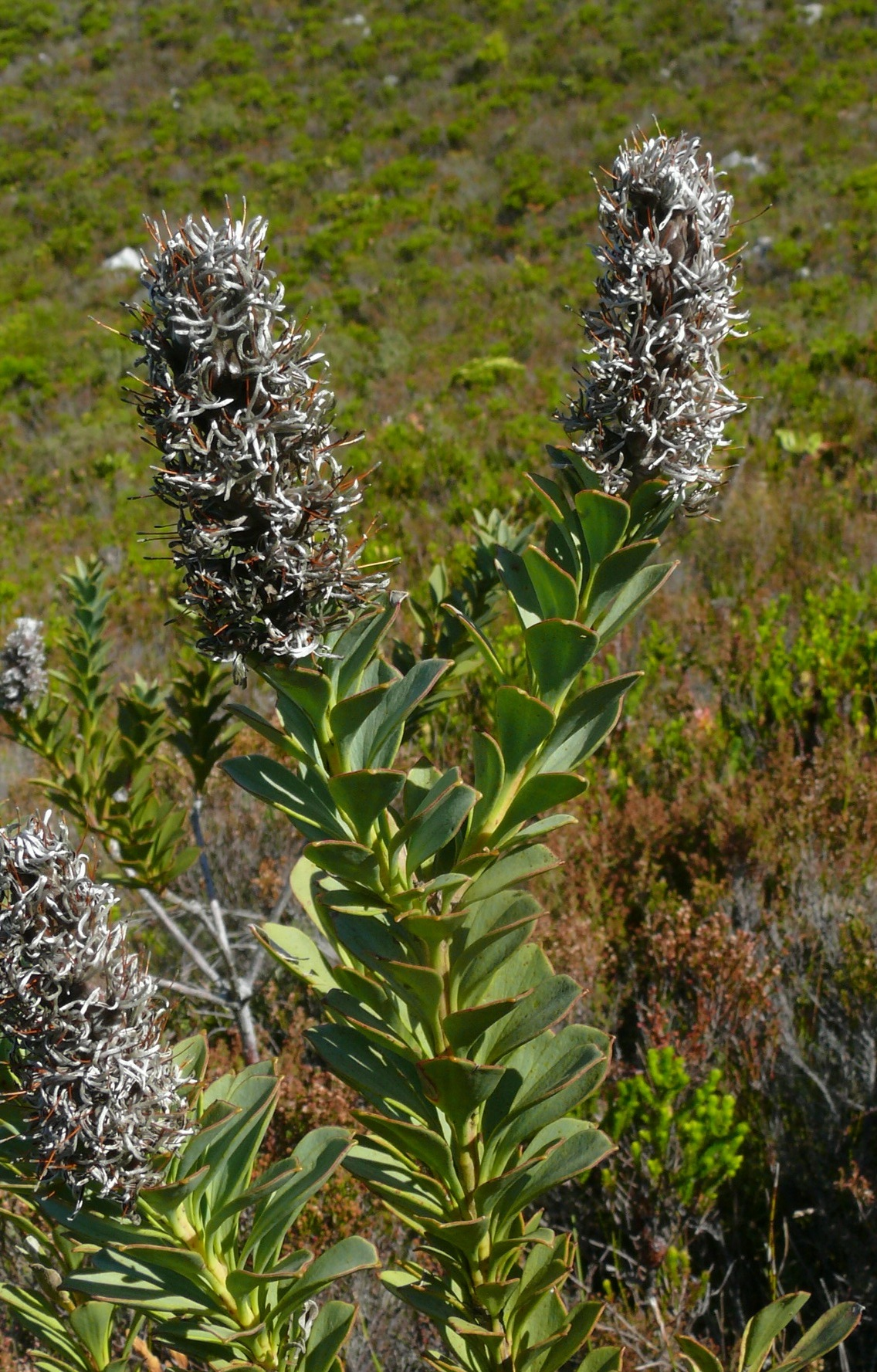

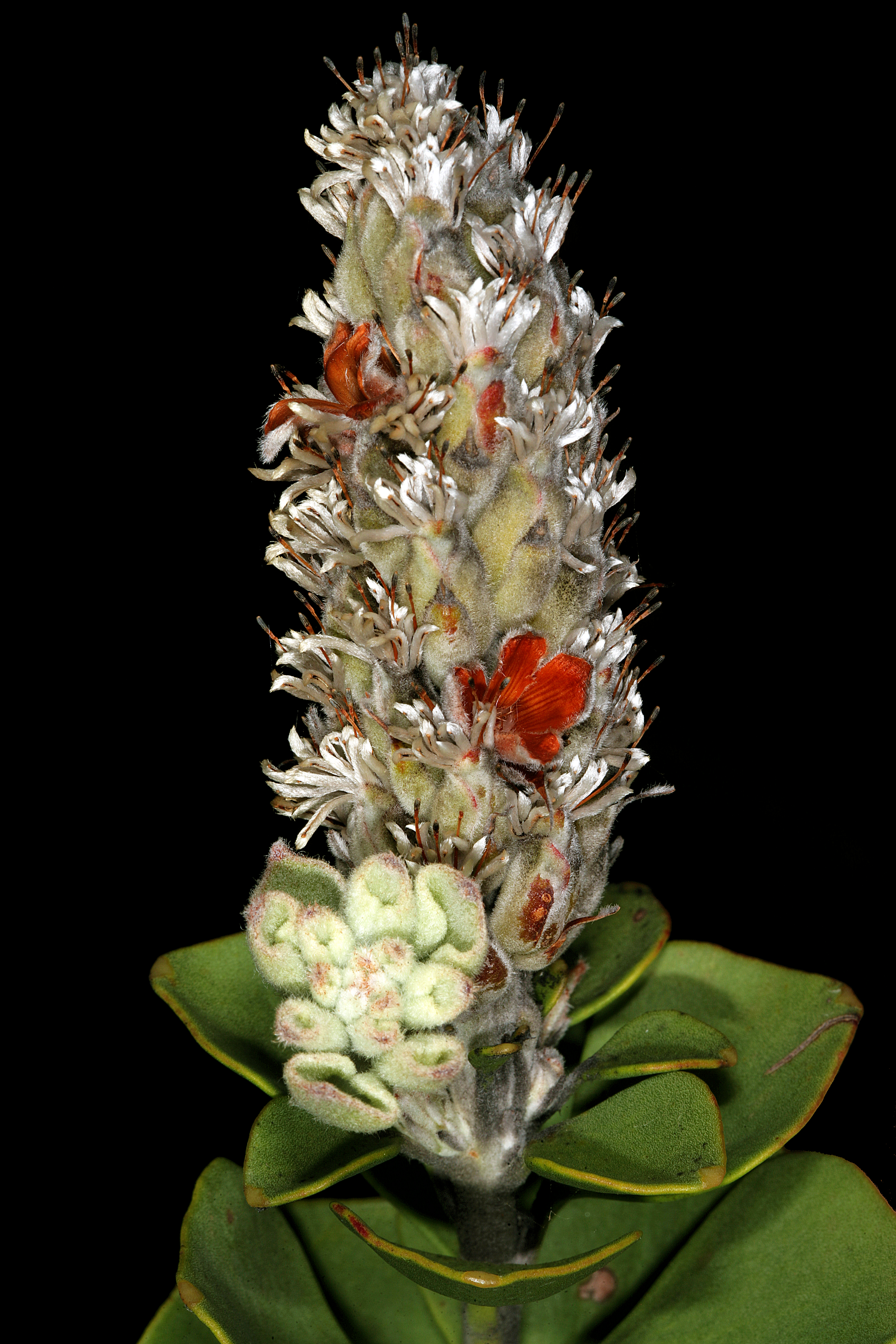
