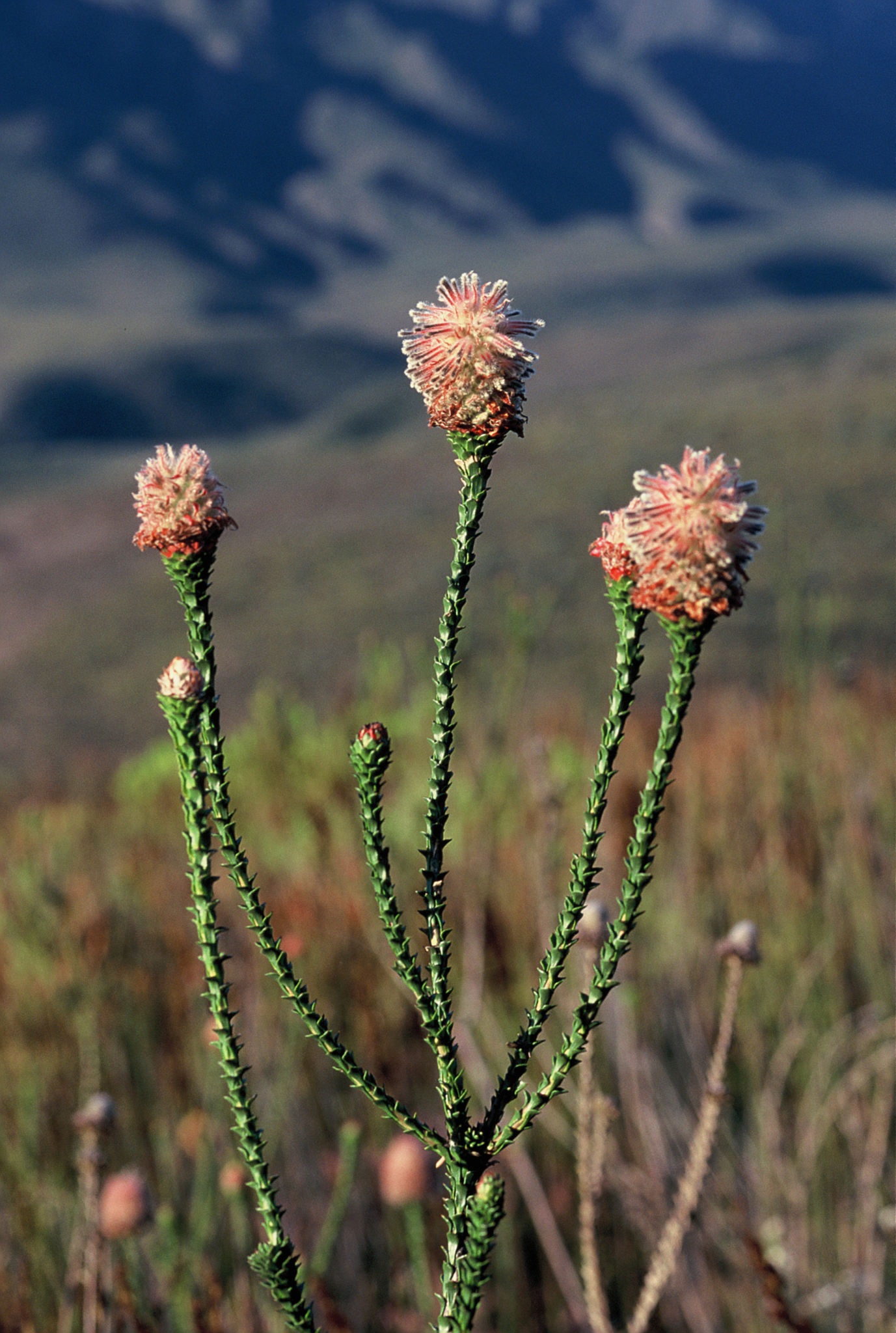

Conservation status
- Endangered (IUCN 3.1)

Scientific classification
- Kingdom: Plantae
- Clade: Tracheophytes
- Clade: Angiosperms
- Clade: Eudicots
- Order: Proteales
- Family: Proteaceae
- Genus: Paranomus
- Species: P. longicaulis

Binomial name
- Paranomus longicaulis Salisb. ex Knight

Synonyms
- Nivenia diversifolia E.Phillips & Hutch.; Paranomus diversifolius (E.Phillips & Hutch.) E.Phillips; Protea diversifolia Poir.; Soranthe diversifolia Kuntze; Sorocephalus diversifolius R.Br.

= Paranomus longicaulis =

Species of plant

Paranomus longicaulis, commonly known as exploding baked apple and woolly sceptre, is a flower-bearing shrub that belongs to the genus Paranomus and forms part of the fynbos. The plant is native to the Western Cape where it occurs on the eastern Langeberg from Garcia Pass to the Attakwaskloof.

The shrub grows up to 2.5 m tall and flowers mainly from September to December. Fire destroys the plant but the seeds survive. The plant is bisexual and pollination takes place through the action of insects. The fruit ripens two months after the plant has flowered and the seeds fall to the ground where they are spread by ants. The plant grows in sandstone soil at altitudes of 400 - 600 m.

In Afrikaans, the shrub is known as the poppiebos.
