= Paranomus adiantifolius =

Conservation status
- Endangered (IUCN 3.1)

Scientific classification
- Kingdom: Plantae
- Clade: Tracheophytes
- Clade: Angiosperms
- Clade: Eudicots
- Order: Proteales
- Family: Proteaceae
- Genus: Paranomus
- Species: P. adiantifolius

Binomial name
- Paranomus adiantifolius Salisb. ex Knight

Synonyms
- Nivenia parvifolia R.Br.; Paranomus parvifolius (R.Br.) Kuntze; Protea gustaviana Poir.; Protea sceptrum Lam.; Protea spathulata Willd. ex Spreng.

Species of flowering plant

Paranomus adiantifolius, the hairy-style sceptre, is a flower-bearing shrub that belongs to the genus Paranomus and forms part of the fynbos. The plant is native to the Western Cape, South Africa.

== Description ==
The shrub grows 1.7 m (5.6 ft) tall and flowers mainly from September to November. Fire destroys the plant but the seeds survive. The plant is bisexual and pollinated by insects. The fruit ripens two months after flowering, and the seeds fall to the ground where they are spread by ants.

In Afrikaans, it is known as harigestylsepter.

== Distribution and habitat ==
The plant occurs at Wolfieskop in the Riviersonderend Mountains, Groenlandberg, and Houhoek. It grows in sandstone soil at altitudes of 500–1,000 m (1,600–3,300 ft).
