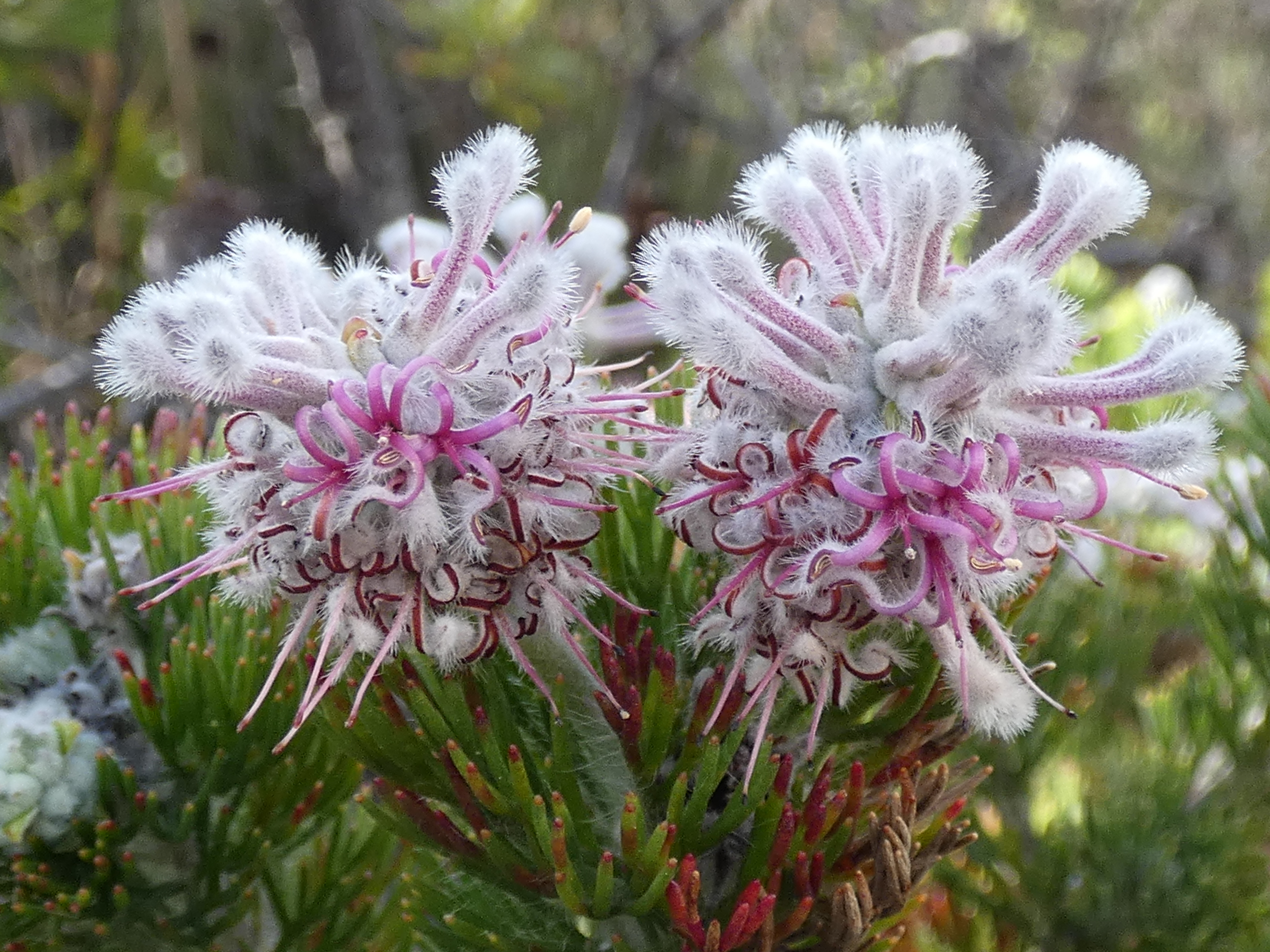
- Paranomus abrotanifolius

Scientific classification
- Kingdom: Plantae
- Clade: Tracheophytes
- Clade: Angiosperms
- Clade: Eudicots
- Order: Proteales
- Family: Proteaceae
- Subtribe: Leucadendrinae
- Genus: Paranomus; Salisb., 1807

Synonyms
- Nivenia R.Br.

= Paranomus =

Genus of plants endemic to South Africa

Paranomus is a genus of 18 species of flowering plants, commonly known as "sceptres", in the protea family. It is endemic to the Cape Floristic Region of South Africa.

== Distribution and habitat ==
The species occur mainly in mountainous areas of the Western and Eastern Cape provinces from the Cederberg to Uitenhage, with the highest numbers found in the districts of Caledon, Worcester and Swellendam. They are often associated with fynbos habitats.

== Etymology ==
The genus was named by English botanist Richard Anthony Salisbury from its unusual leaves, from the Greek para ("illegal" or "contrary"), and nomos ("custom" or "law"). It was subsequently renamed Nivenia by rival botanist Robert Brown to honour plant collector James Niven, but Salisbury's name has priority. They are commonly known as “sceptres” or “sceptre plants” for the shape of their inflorescences and after the first of the genus to be described, P. sceptrum-gustavianus – “King Gustav's sceptre”, in 1777.

== Description ==
All species are shrubs, though some can grow quite large; for example P. tomentosus may become, at up to 3 m (9.8 ft) high, a small tree. Like the closely related serrurias they have divided leaves, though a distinctive feature of the genus is that individual plants of some species can bear both normal leaves and ones that are only minimally or even undivided. Other strange features of the leaves are that they do not have distinct upper and lower surfaces and their venation is primitive. The flowerheads are spike-like inflorescences in which the flowers are grouped into fours, with each group of four carried beneath a leathery bract. The shell-like bracts remain on the plant for a year or longer, well after the seeds have dropped off. The plants are not serotinous. They do not resprout after fires but regenerate from seeds which are shed soon after flowering.

== Species ==
Described species include:

- Paranomus abrotanifolius Salisb. ex Knight – Bredasdorp sceptre
- Paranomus adiantifolius Salisb. ex Knight – Hairy-style sceptre
- Paranomus bolusii (Gand.) Levyns – Overberg or Viking sceptre
- Paranomus bracteolaris Salisb. ex Knight – Smooth-leaf tree sceptre
- Paranomus candicans Kuntze – Powder sceptre
- Paranomus capitatus Kuntze – Fine-leaf sceptre
- Paranomus centaureoides Levyns – Ladismith sceptre
- Paranomus dispersus Levyns – Long-head sceptre
- Paranomus dregei Kuntze – Scented sceptre
- Paranomus esterhuyseniae Levyns – Kouga sceptre
- Paranomus lagopus Salisb. – Rabbit-paw sceptre
- Paranomus longicaulis Salisb. ex Knight – Woolly sceptre or exploding baked apple
- Paranomus reflexus N.E. Br. – Van Staden's sceptre
- Paranomus roodebergensis (Compton) Levyns – Honey-scented sceptre
- Paranomus sceptrum-gustavianus Hyl. – King Gustav's sceptre
- Paranomus spathulatus Kuntze – Langeberg sceptre
- Paranomus spicatus Kuntze – Kogelberg sceptre
- Paranomus tomentosus N.E. Br. – Hairy-leaf sceptre
