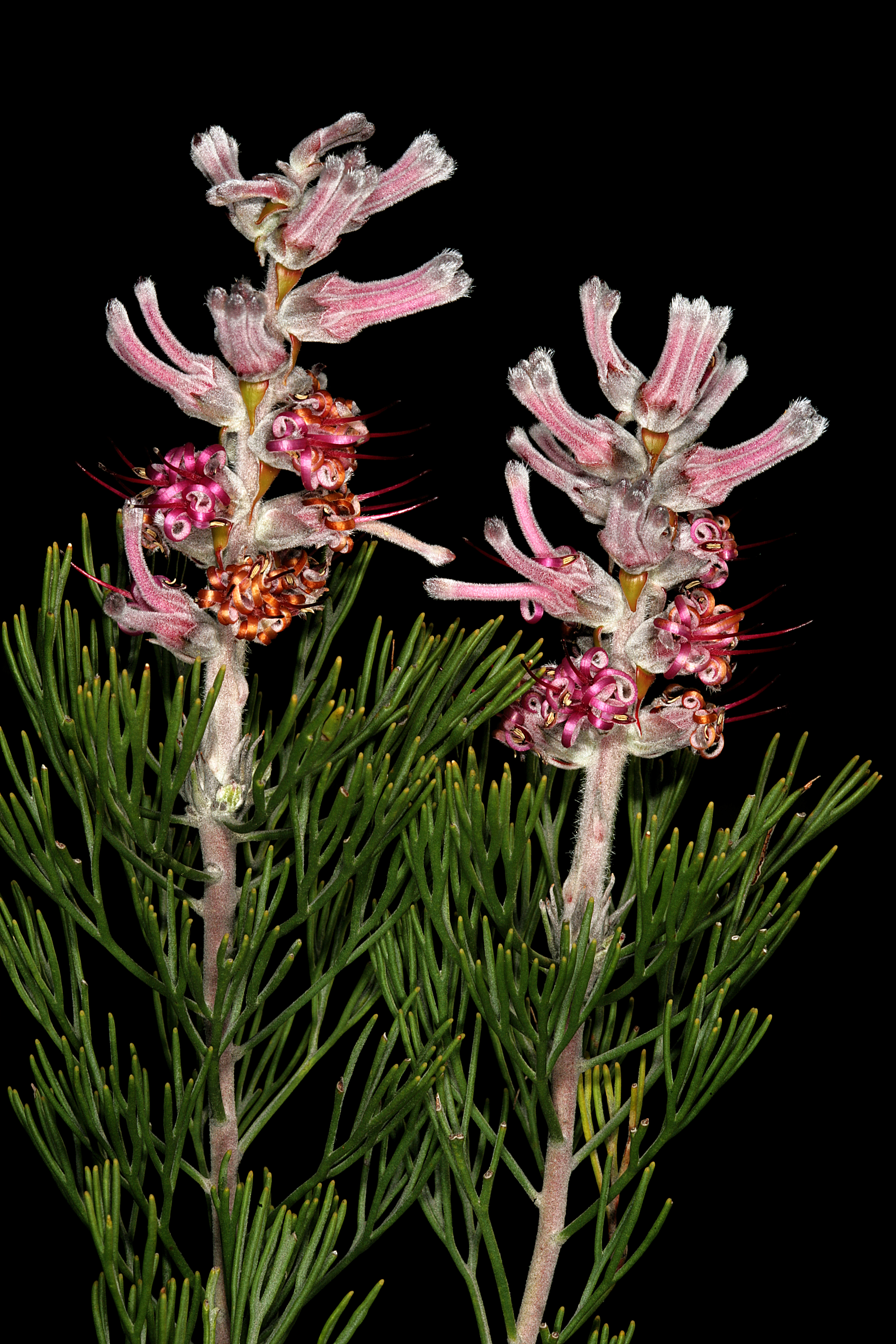

Conservation status
- Near Threatened (IUCN 3.1)

Scientific classification
- Kingdom: Plantae
- Clade: Embryophytes
- Clade: Tracheophytes
- Clade: Angiosperms
- Clade: Eudicots
- Order: Proteales
- Family: Proteaceae
- Genus: Paranomus
- Species: P. bracteolaris

Binomial name
- Paranomus bracteolaris Salisb. ex Knight

= Paranomus bracteolaris =

Species of plant

Paranomus bracteolaris, the smooth-leaf tree sceptre or Bokkeveld sceptre, is a flower-bearing shrub that belongs to the genus Paranomus and forms part of the fynbos. The plant is native to the Western Cape and Northern Cape, South Africa.

== Description ==
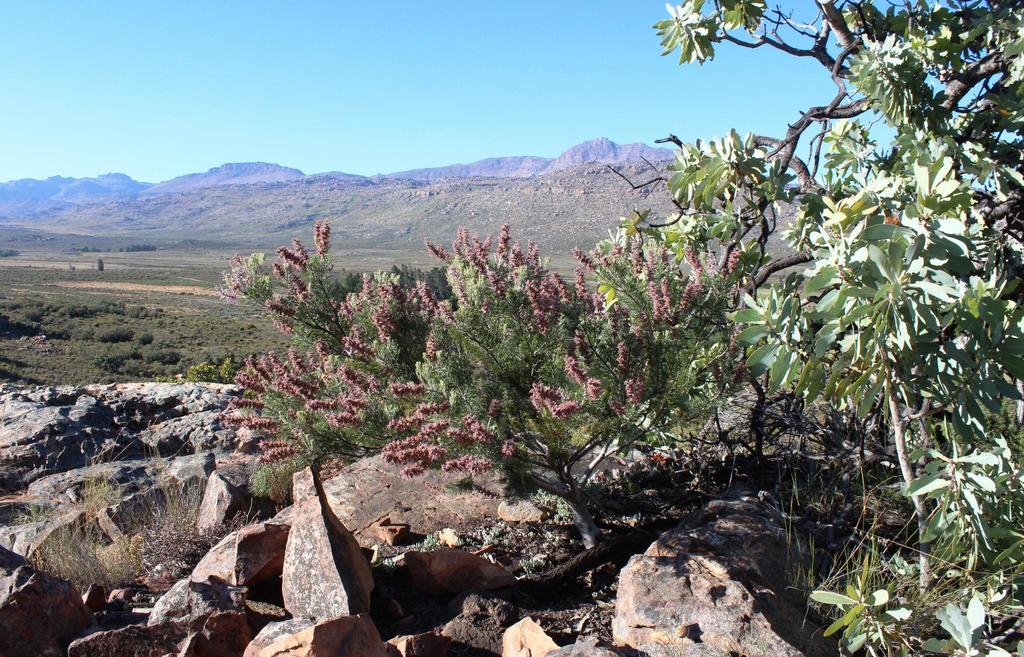

The shrub is monoecious and grows up to 2 m (6.6 ft) tall and flowers from August to October. The leaves are finely divided into acicular segments; they are hairy when they are young. The flowers are arranged in small clusters in veins at the tips of the branches. They are purple-pink and 20–25 mm (0.79–0.98 in) long. Fire destroys the plant but the seeds survive. The plant is bisexual and pollinated by insects. The fruit ripens two months after the plant has flowered and the seeds fall to the ground where they are spread by ants.

In Afrikaans, it is known as bokkeveld-septerboom, afveebos, balbyterbos, haakbos, heuningbos, kloofbesem, perdebos, sousbos, trosbos, vliegbos.

The tree's national number is 72.3 on the list of South African indigenous trees.

== Distribution and habitat ==
The plant occurs on the Bokkeveld Carp, in the Cold Bokkeveld and the Olifants River Mountains. It grows sandstone soil at altitudes of 250–1,300 m (820–4,270 ft).

== Gallery ==
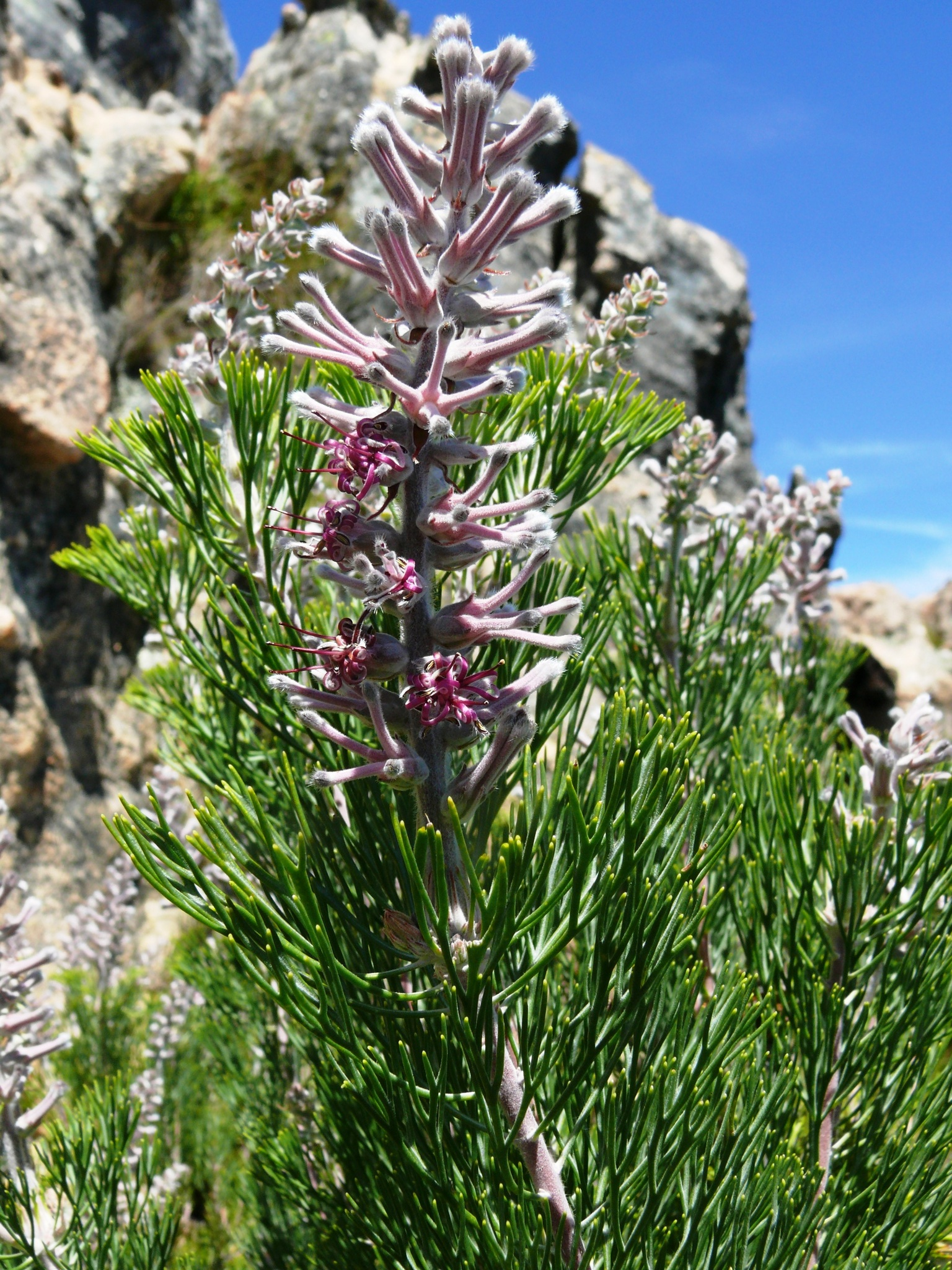

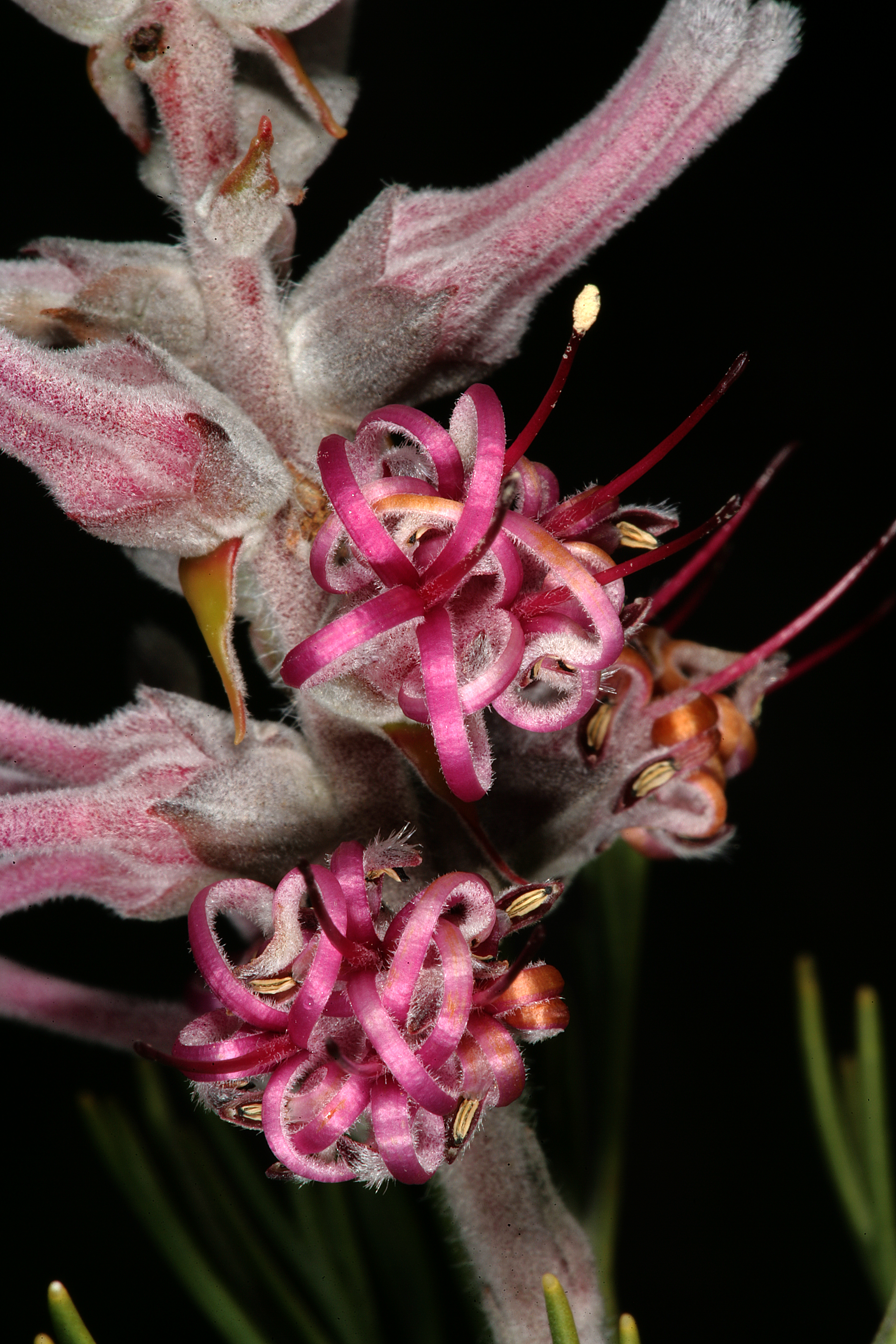

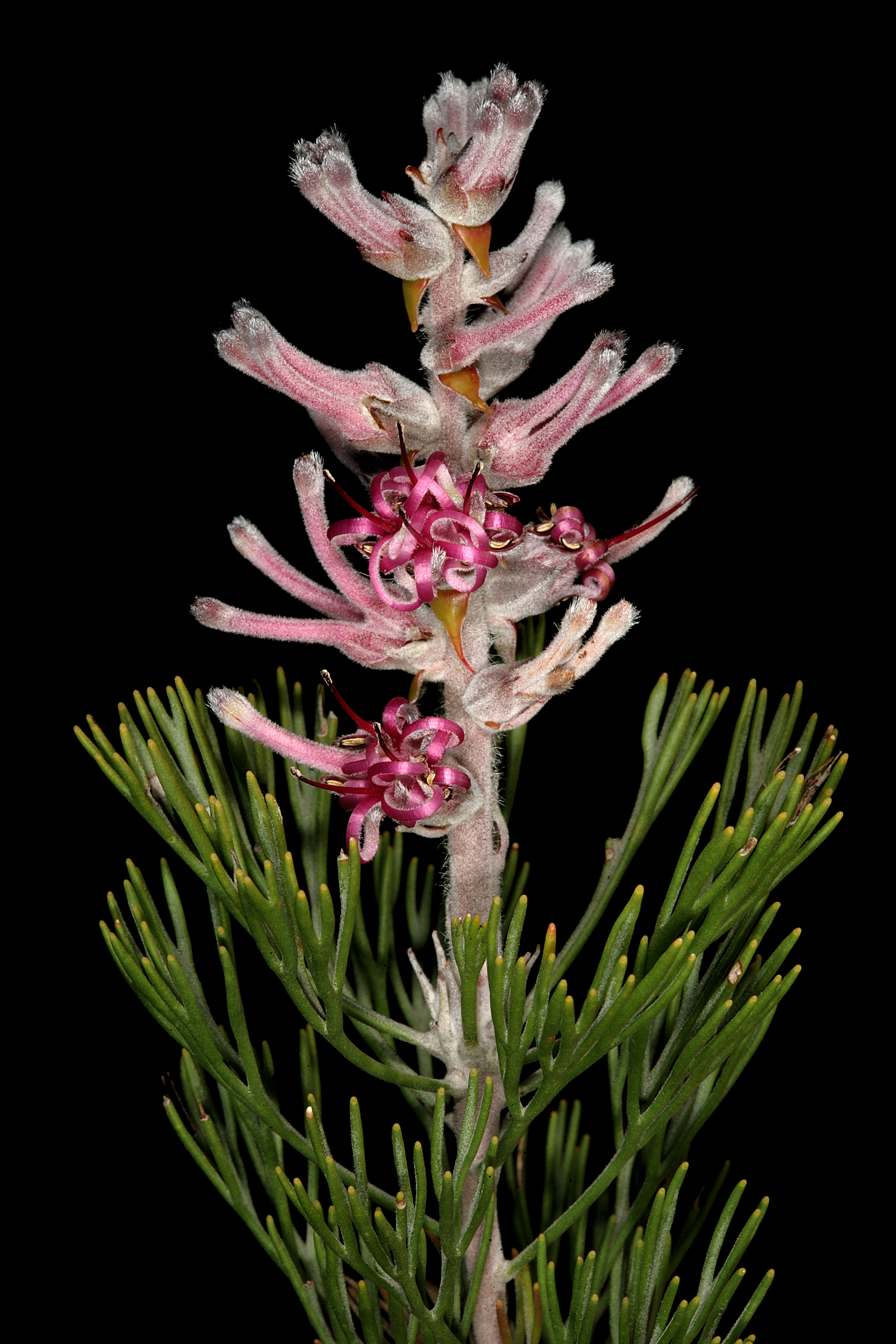

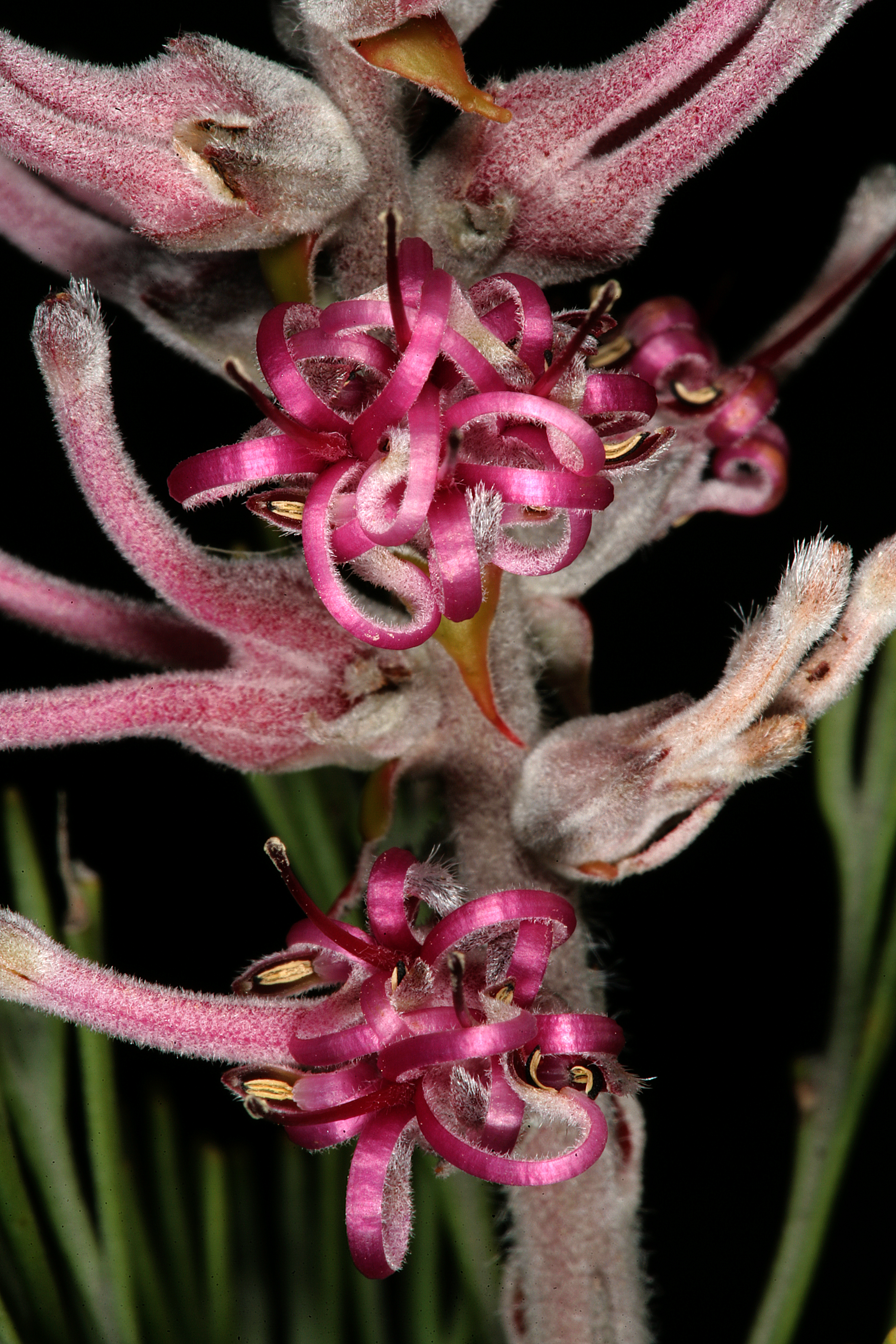

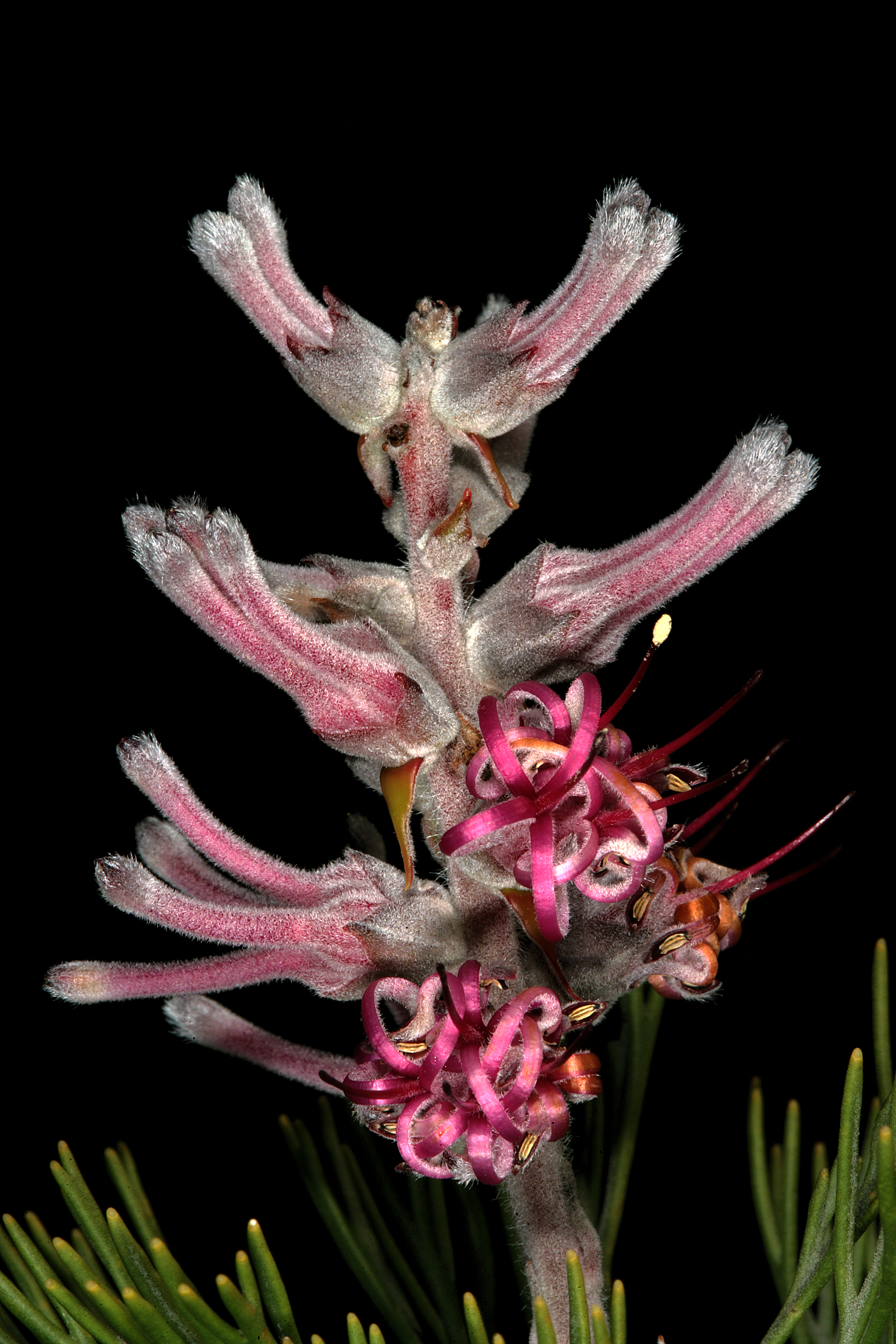

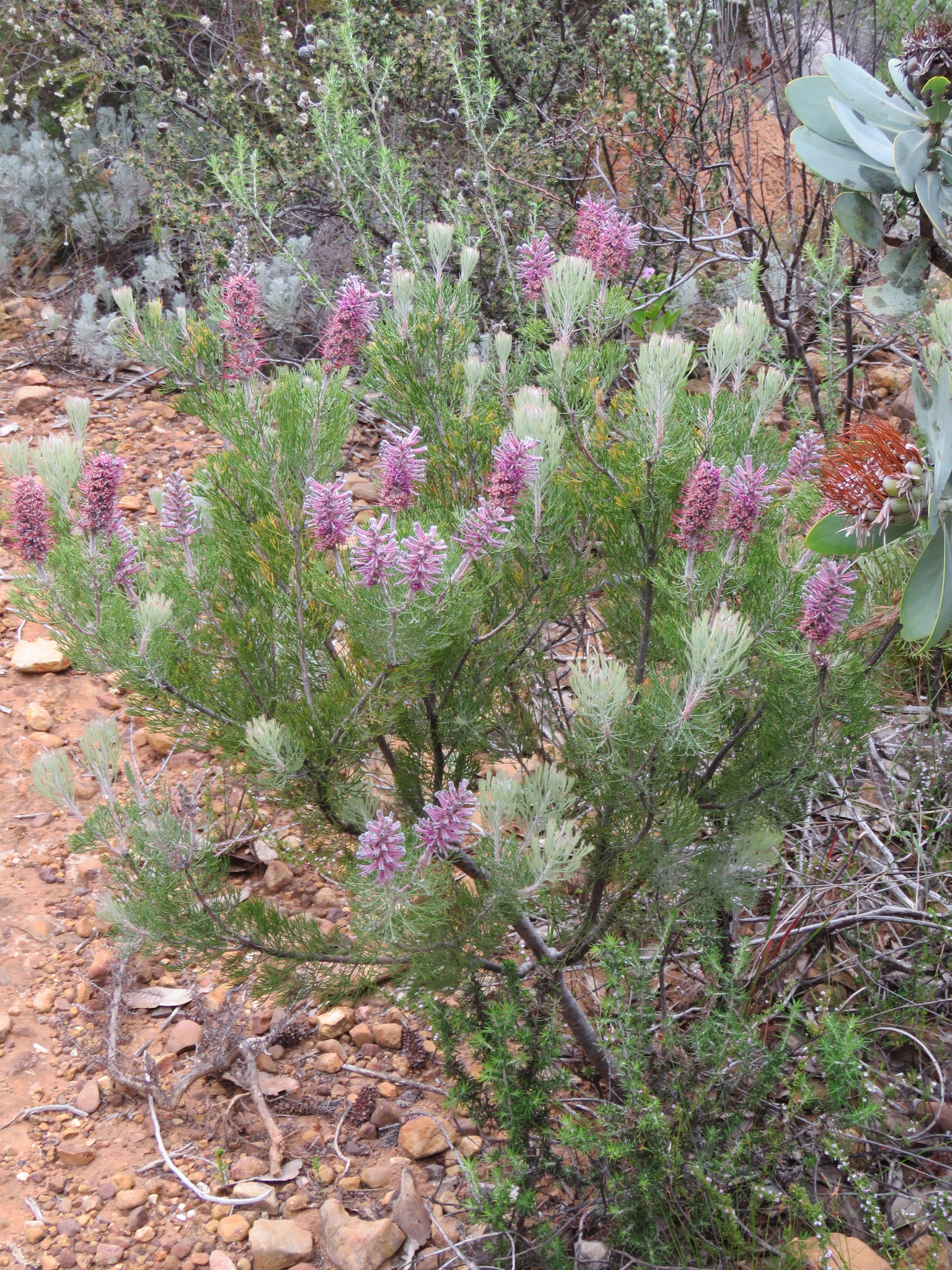

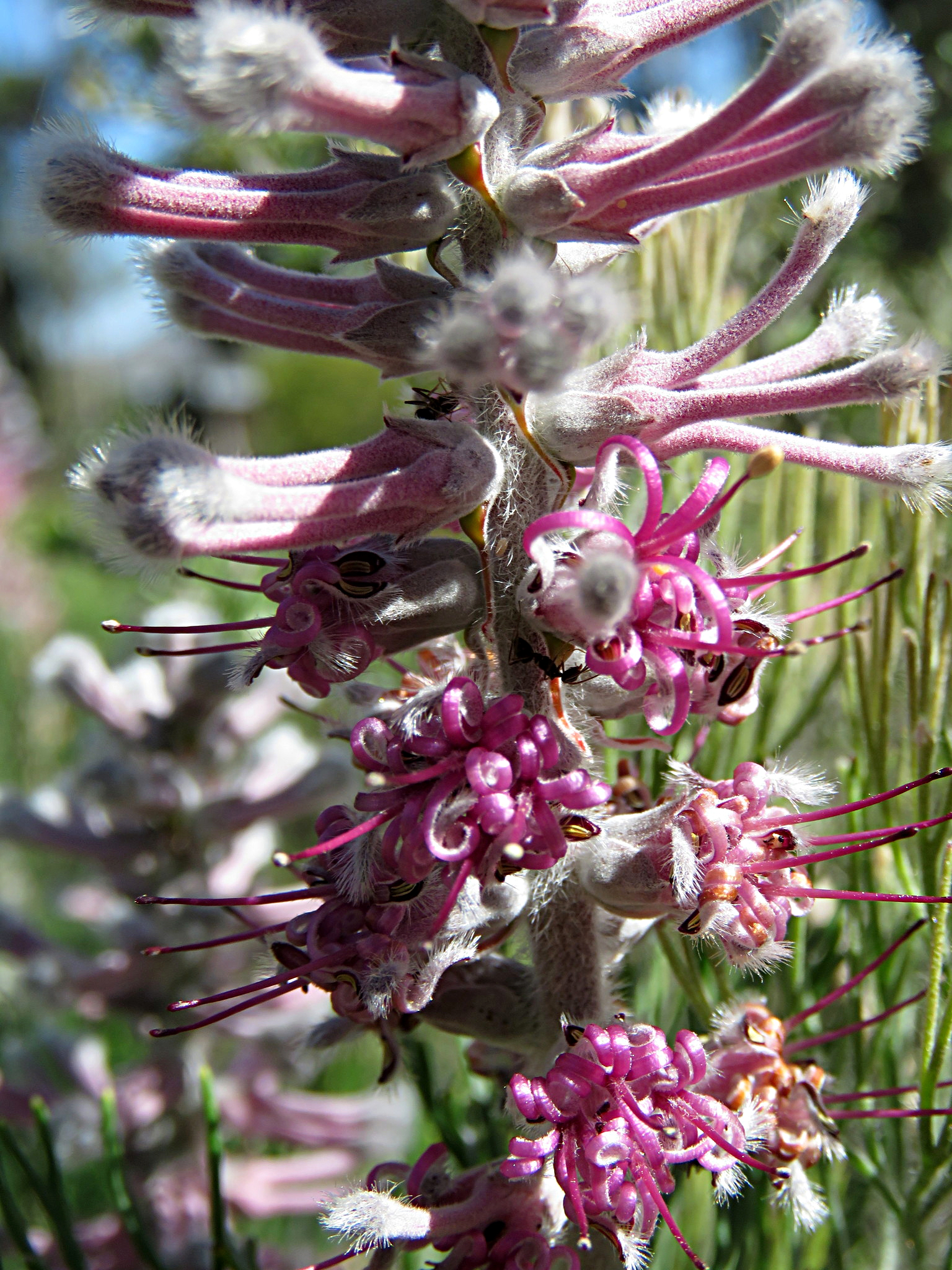

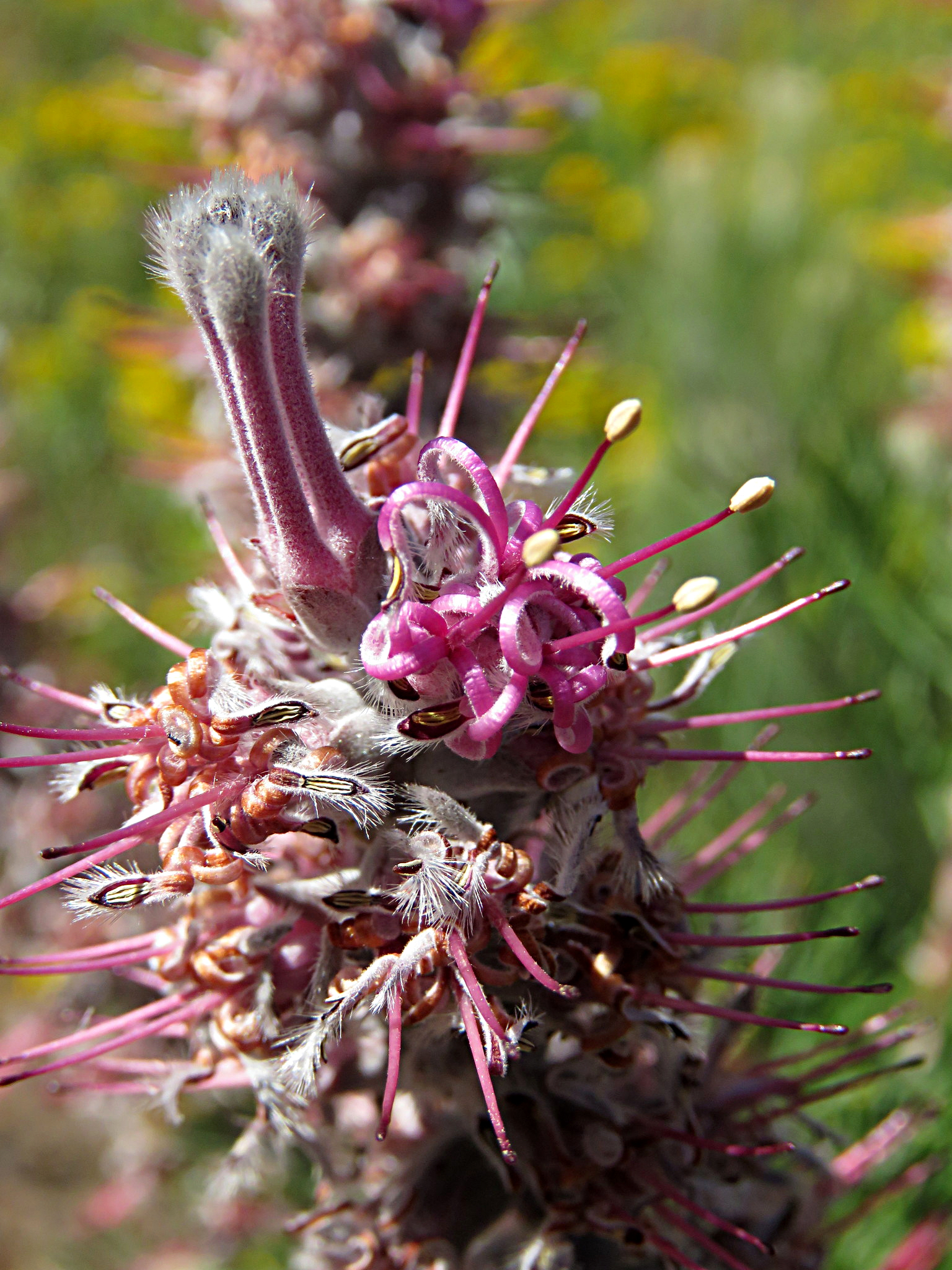

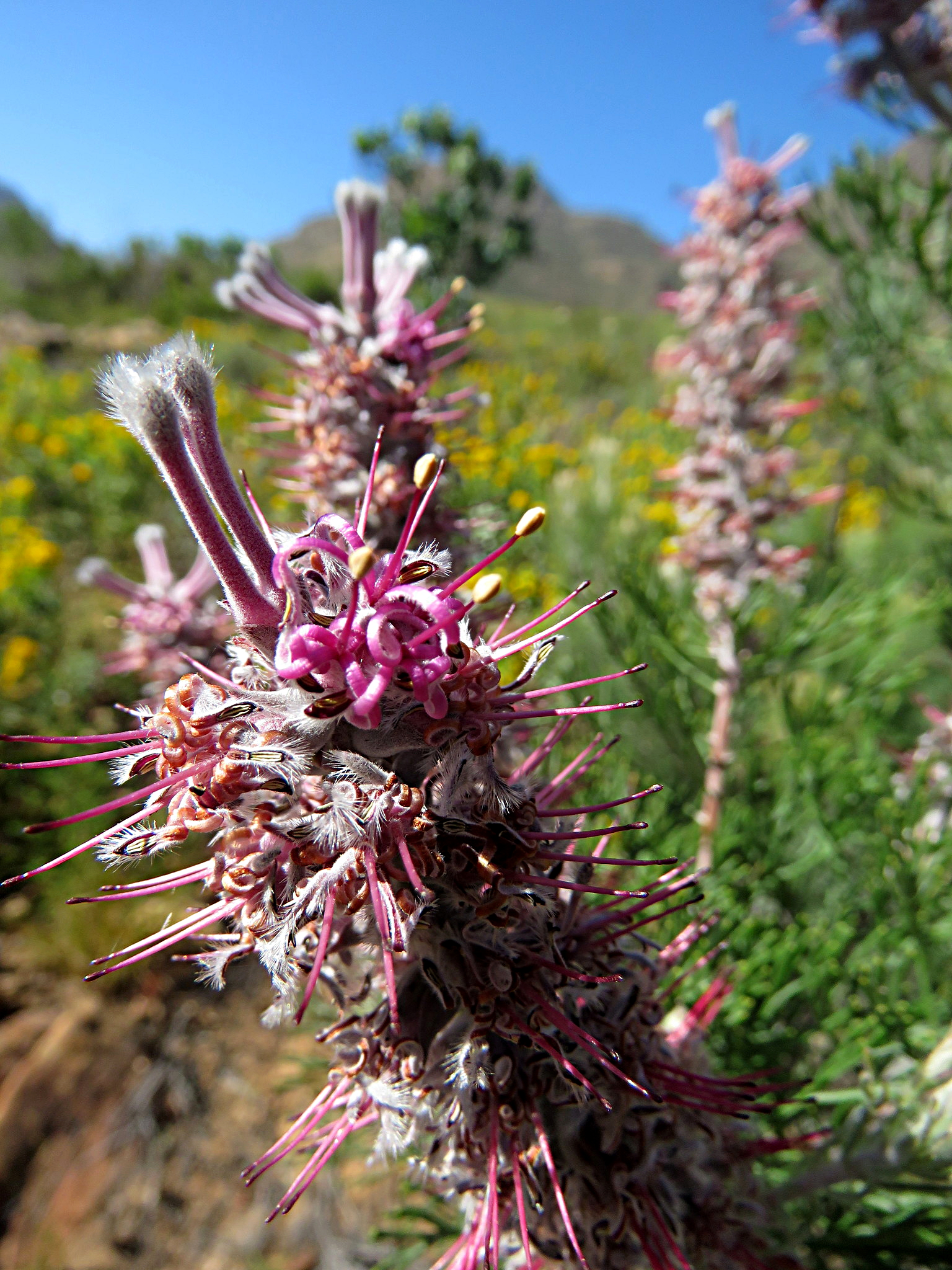

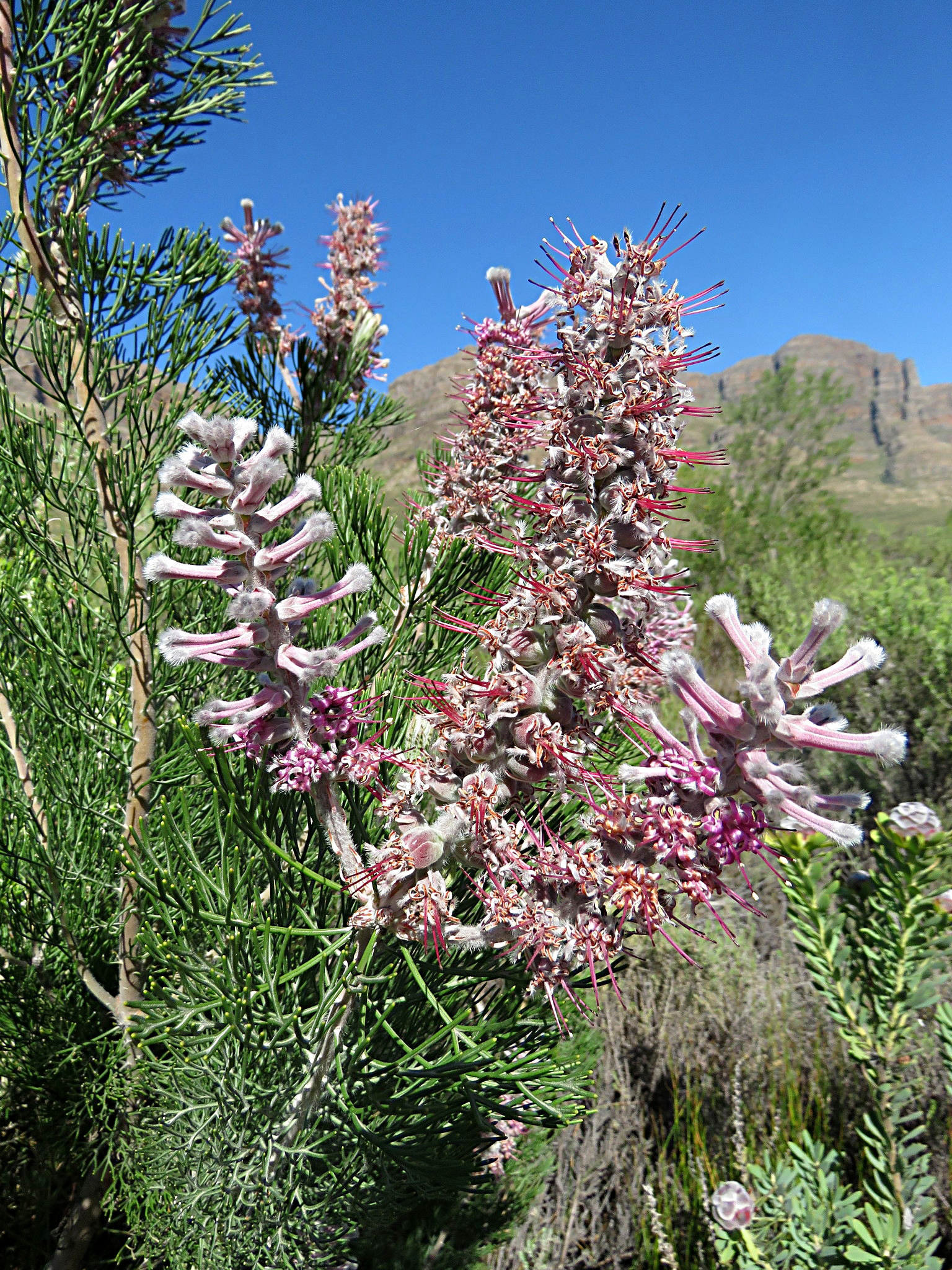

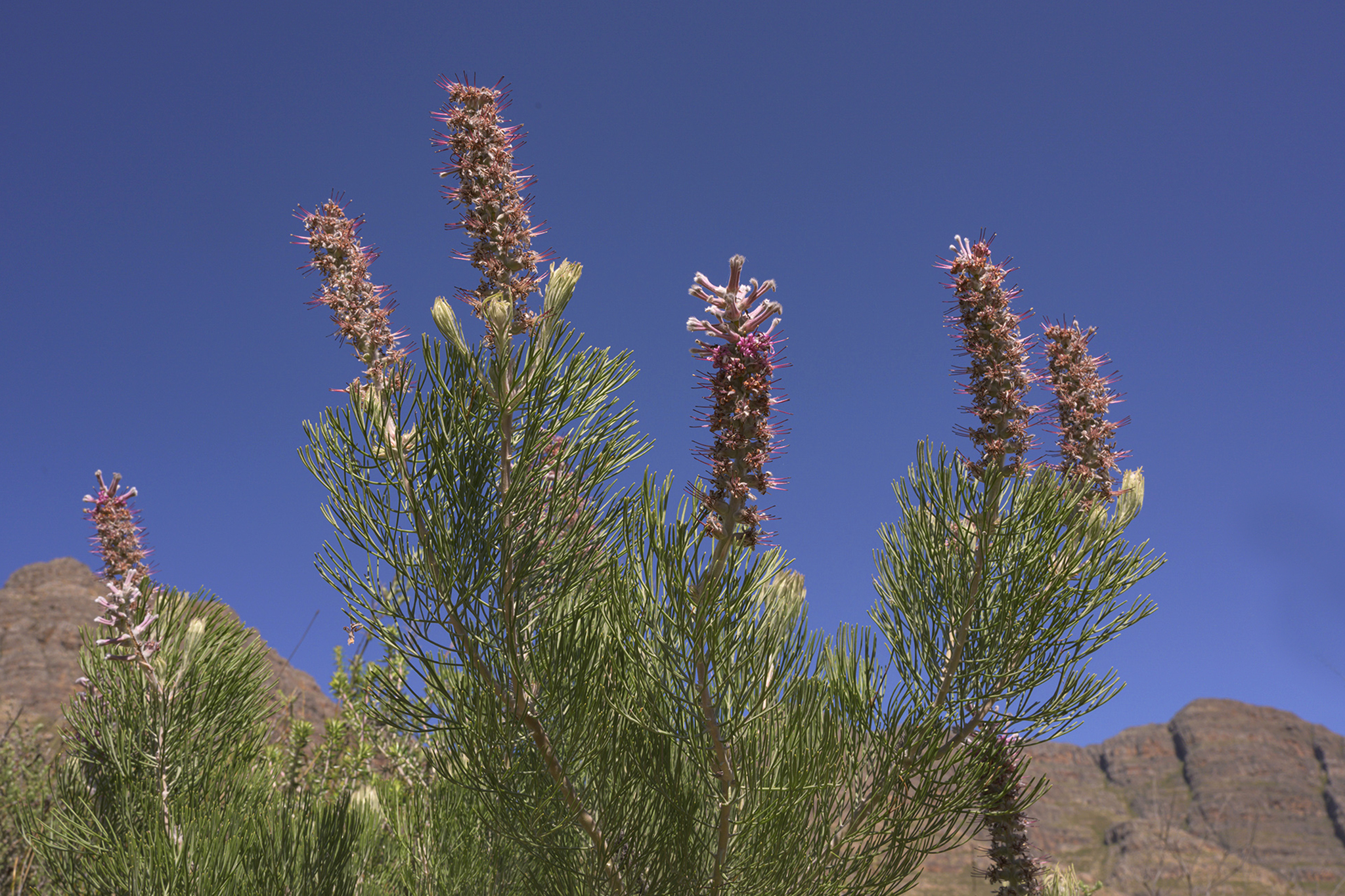
