= Paranomus spicatus =

Conservation status
- Vulnerable (IUCN 3.1)

Scientific classification
- Kingdom: Plantae
- Clade: Tracheophytes
- Clade: Angiosperms
- Clade: Eudicots
- Order: Proteales
- Family: Proteaceae
- Genus: Paranomus
- Species: P. spicatus

Binomial name
- Paranomus spicatus (P.J.Bergius) Kuntz

Synonyms
- Leucadendron spicatum P.J.Bergius; Nivenia spicata R.Br.; Paranomus crithmifolius Knight; Protea lagopus Willd.; Protea spicata L.

Species of flowering plant

Paranomus spicatus, the Kogelberg sceptre, is a flower-bearing shrub that belongs to the genus Paranomus and forms part of the fynbos . The plant is native to the Western Cape where it occurs in the Hottentots Holland Mountains from Sir Lowry's Pass to Kogelberg.

The shrub grows up to 1 m tall and flowers from September to November. Fire destroys the plant but the seeds survive. The plant is bisexual and pollination takes place through the action of insects. The fruit ripens, two months after flowering, and the seeds fall to the ground where they are spread by ants. The plant grows in shale soil which is also suitable for vineyards at heights of 200-300m.

In Afrikaans it is known as perdebos or poppies.
