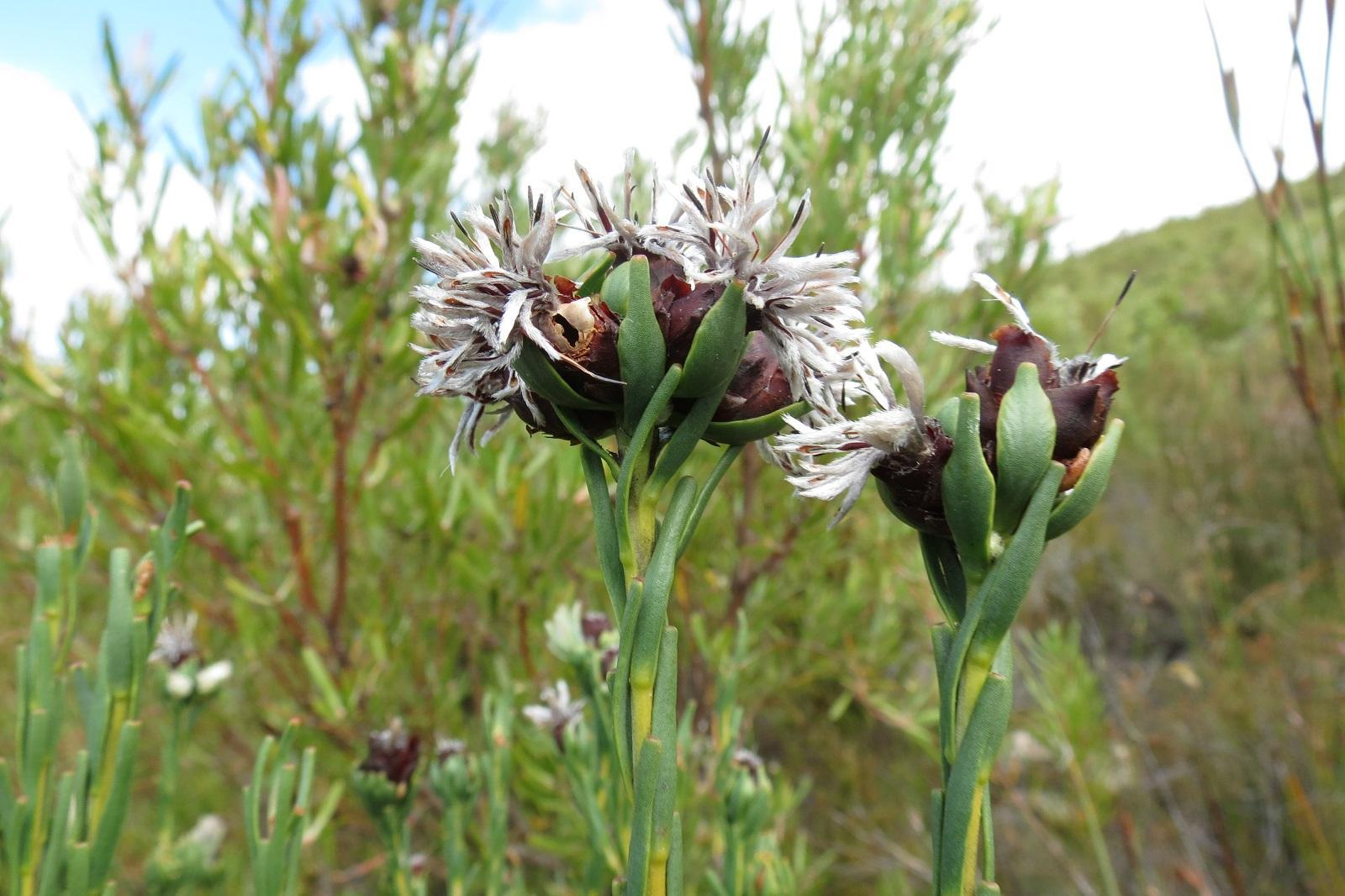

Conservation status
- Least Concern (IUCN 3.1)

Scientific classification
- Kingdom: Plantae
- Clade: Tracheophytes
- Clade: Angiosperms
- Clade: Eudicots
- Order: Proteales
- Family: Proteaceae
- Genus: Paranomus
- Species: P. centaureoides

Binomial name
- Paranomus centaureoides Levyns

= Paranomus centaureoides =

Species of flowering plant

Paranomus centaureoides, the Ladismith sceptre, is a flower-bearing shrub that belongs to the genus Paranomus and forms part of the fynbos. The plant is native to the Western Cape, South Africa.

== Description ==
The shrub grows up to 1.5 m (4.9 ft) tall and flowers mainly from June to November. Fire destroys the plant but the seeds survive. The plant is bisexual and pollinated by insects. The fruit ripens two months after flowering, and the seeds fall to the ground where they are spread by ants.

== Distribution and habitat ==
The plant occurs in the Swartberg between Ladismith and Seweweekspoort. It grows in sandstone sand at altitudes of 1,000–2,000 m (3,300–6,600 ft).
