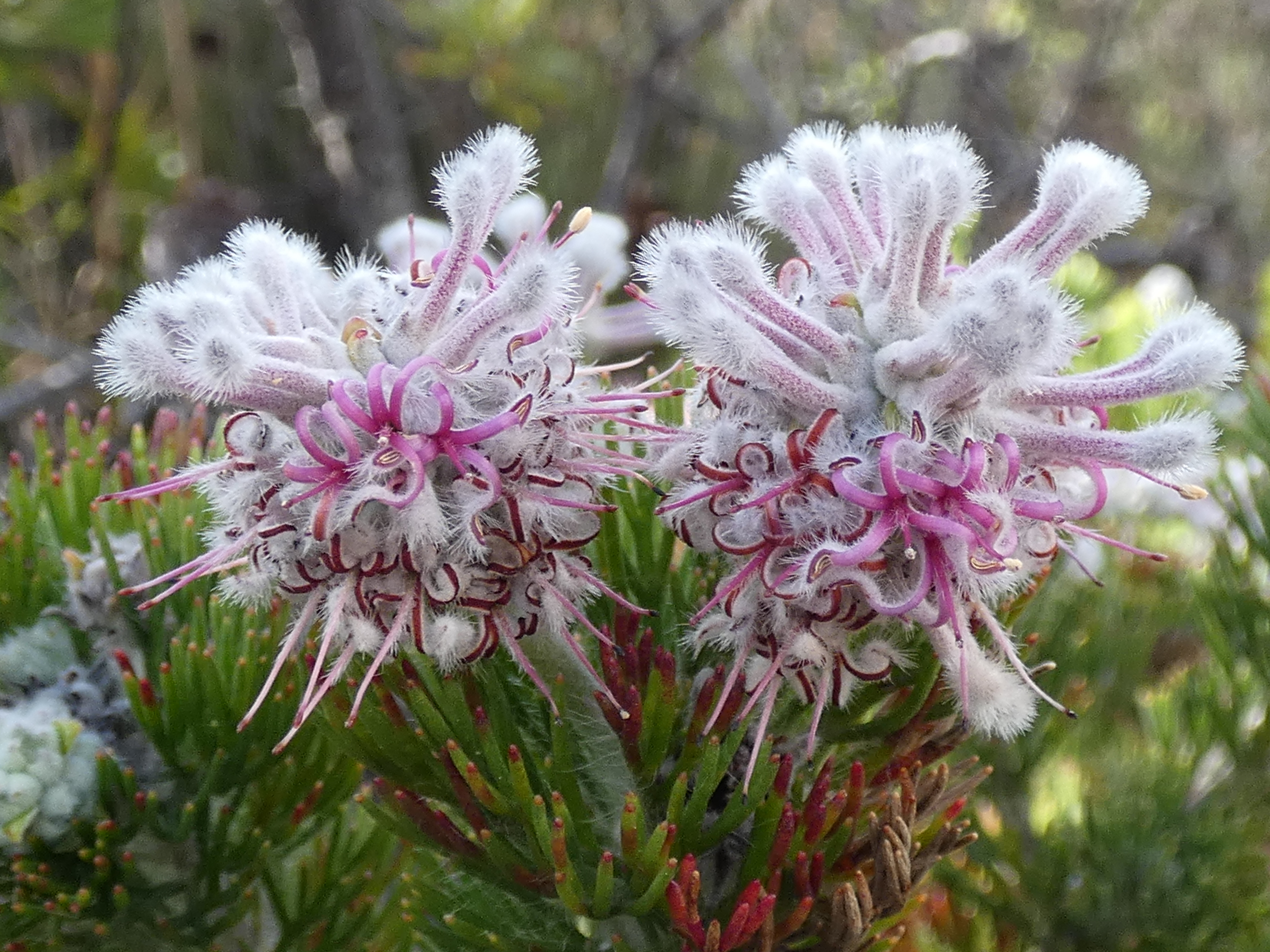

Conservation status
- Near Threatened (IUCN 3.1)

Scientific classification
- Kingdom: Plantae
- Clade: Embryophytes
- Clade: Tracheophytes
- Clade: Angiosperms
- Clade: Eudicots
- Order: Proteales
- Family: Proteaceae
- Genus: Paranomus
- Species: P. abrotanifolius

Binomial name
- Paranomus abrotanifolius Salisb. ex Knight

Synonyms
- Nivenia micrantha, P. micranthus

= Paranomus abrotanifolius =

Species of plant native to South Africa

Paranomus abrotanifolius, commonly known as the Bredasdorp sceptre, is a richly branching shrub to 90 cm (35 in) high, with bisexual flowers that can be found from May to December, that is assigned to the protea family. It does not survive the periodic wild fires that occur in the fynbos, where it occurs. It is pollinated by insects. The fruits are ripe and release the seeds about two months after flowering, and the seeds are collected by ants, which take them to their underground nests to feed on their elaiosomes, a behaviour known as myrmecochory. This ensures that the seeds do not burn, so new plants can grow from them. It is a rare endemic species that is only known from ten locations near the southern coast of the Western Cape province of South Africa. It grows on weathered sandstone on the Potberg in De Hoop Nature Reserve and the Elim Flats.

== Description ==
Paranomus abrotanifolius is a richly branching shrub that grows up to 90 cm (35 in) high, with branches covered with soft, weak, thin and clearly separated hairs (or pilose), alternately set with leaves that are all alike (unlike in some other Paranomus species), 4–5 cm (1.6–2.0 in) long, twice pinnately divided in the top half, soon losing the soft hairs, ending in slender segments that are circular in cross section with a stump tip and up to 1¼ cm (½ in) long. The flowers are grouped with four together in heads, and the heads themselves in dense spikes of about 6⅓ cm (2½ in) long and 1¼ cm (½ in) in diameter, and the spikes are on their own or with a few together at the tip of the branches. The stem of each spike is covered in felty hairs. The narrow, awl-shaped, densely felty bract that subtends each group of four flowers is about 8½ mm (⅓ in) long, while the almost papery bract supporting the individual flower is covered in dense long felty hairs on the outside, about 5 mm (0.2 in) long and 2½ mm (0.1 in) wide, oval in shape, with a gradually pointed tip. Just before opening, the flower is up to 8½ mm (⅓ in) long, the corolla tube may have soft short hairs or not, while the four free lobes are 7⅓ mm (0.3 in) long and coil when the flower opens. The anthers are directly attached to the inside of the corolla lobes with no discernible filament. The ovary that is encircled by a row of hairs, is topped by a style of 8–10 mm (0.31–0.39 in) long, with few soft hairs in the lower half, at the top gradually converging into an elliptic, more or less stump stigma of about ¾ mm (0.03 in) long. The subtribe Proteinae to which the genus Paranomus has been assigned consistently has a basic chromosome number of twelve (2n=24).

== Taxonomy ==
English plantsman Joseph Knight described the species in his 1809 work On the cultivation of the plants belonging to the natural order of Proteeae, calling it the southern wood-leaved paranomus. He reported it had been collected by one J. Niven in the mountains near Swellendam.
