= Paranomus reflexus =

Conservation status
- Endangered (IUCN 3.1).

Scientific classification
- Kingdom: Plantae
- Clade: Tracheophytes
- Clade: Angiosperms
- Clade: Eudicots
- Order: Proteales
- Family: Proteaceae
- Genus: Paranomus
- Species: P. reflexus

Binomial name
- Paranomus reflexus (E.Phillips & Hutch.) Fourc.

Species of plant

Paranomus reflexus, the Van Staden's scepter, is a flower-bearing shrub that belongs to the family Proteaceae. It is part of the South African fynbos vegetation type. The plant is native to the Eastern Cape where it occurs on the Elandsberg and Van Stadensberg.

The shrub grows up to 1.5 m tall and flowers from June to August. Fire destroys the plant but the seeds survive. The plant is bisexual and pollination takes place through the action of insects. The fruit ripens two months after the plant has flowered and the seeds fall to the ground where they are spread by ants. The plant grows in sandstone soil at altitudes of 1000–2000 m.

In Afrikaans it is known as Van Staden-septerboom. The tree's national number is 72.4
