= Huis River Pass =

Mountain pass in Western Cape, South Africa

Coordinates: 33°29′55″S 21°35′02″E

The Huis River Pass is a mountain pass in Western Cape, South Africa, between Calitzdorp to the east and the old missionary stations of Zoar and Amaliënstein to the west. The pass peaks at 655 m above sea level and has a maximum gradient of 1:14. It crosses the R62 provincial road over the Huis River Mountains, a spur of the Swartberg. The name huis comes from the Khoikhoi word for "willow."

== History ==
The original pass was built in 1897 and renovated during the 1950s, followed by further improvement and pavement in 1966. Graham Ross, the acting District Road Inspector in 1951, searched for means to widen the pass, but could not find any. Retaining walls have been built to divert frequent rockslides.

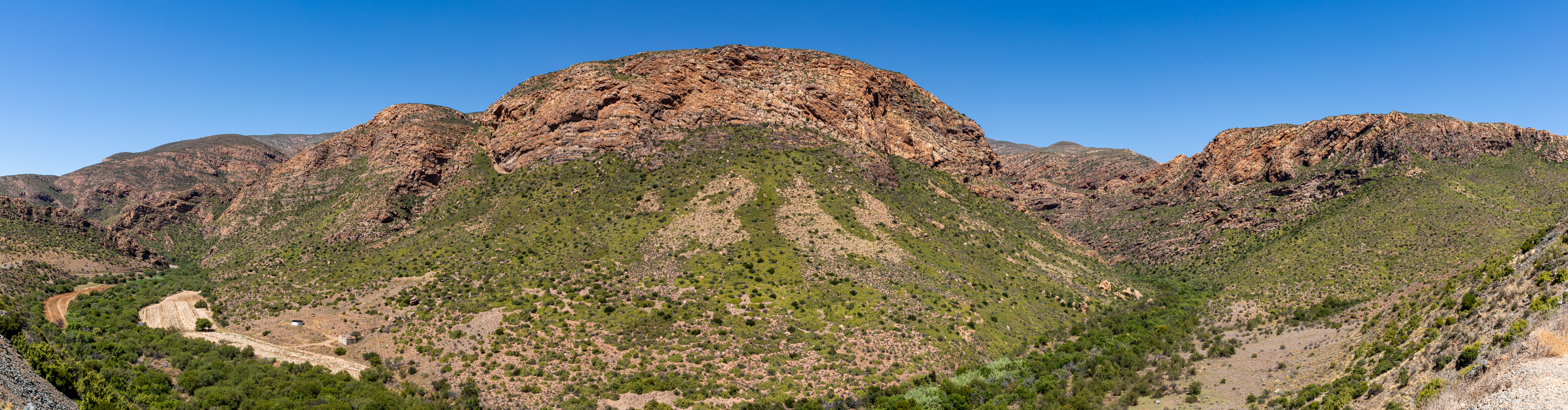
A view over the mountains flanking the pass

== Sources ==
- Ross, Graham (2011). The romance of Cape mountain passes. Cape Town: Sunbird. ISBN 978-1-920289-51-5
