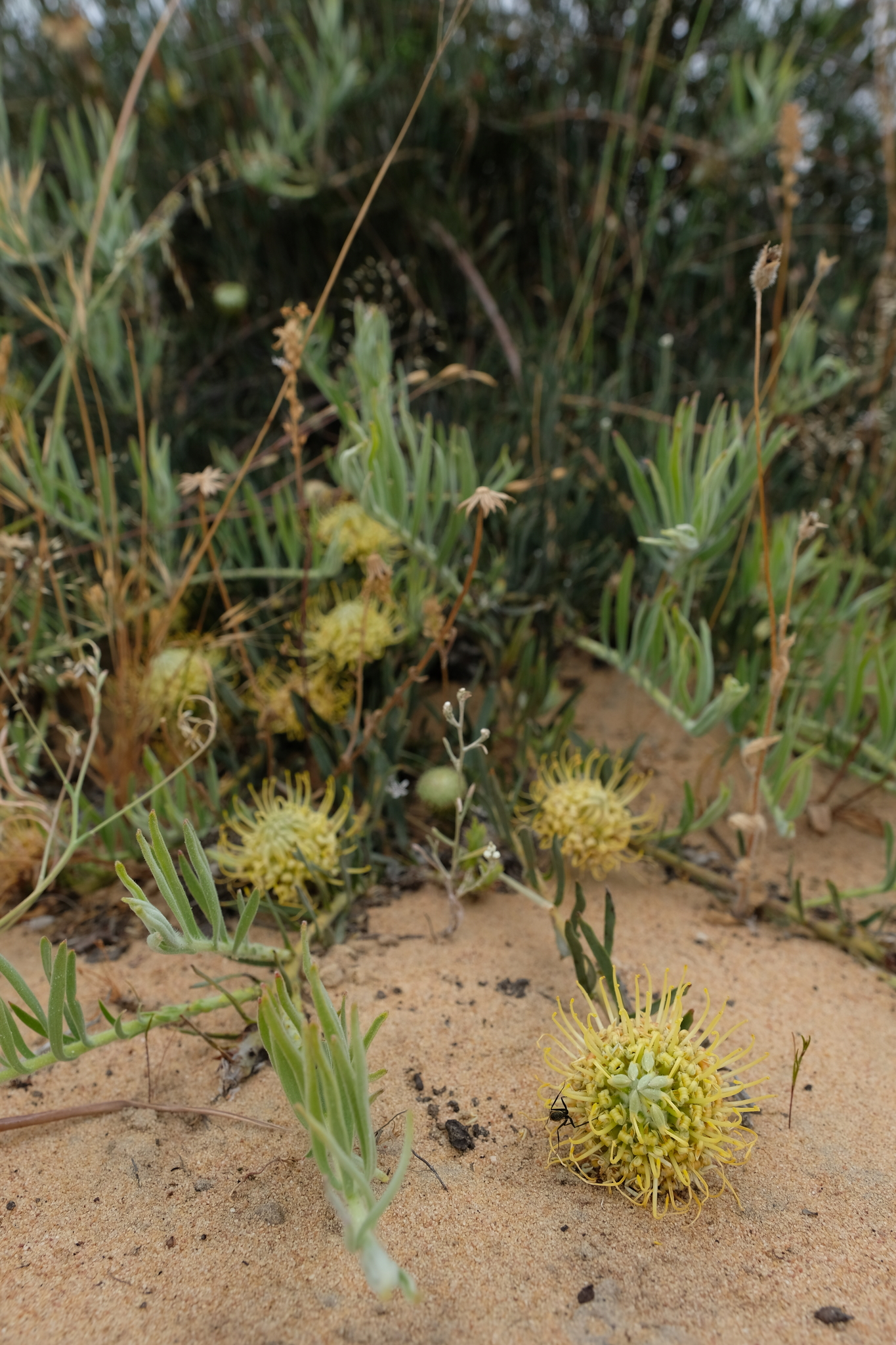

Conservation status
- Critically Endangered (IUCN 3.1)

Scientific classification
- Kingdom: Plantae
- Clade: Embryophytes
- Clade: Tracheophytes
- Clade: Angiosperms
- Clade: Eudicots
- Order: Proteales
- Family: Proteaceae
- Genus: Leucospermum
- Species: L. arenarium

Binomial name
- Leucospermum arenarium Rycroft, 1959

= Leucospermum arenarium =

Species of plant native to South Africa

Leucospermum arenarium is a lax, evergreen shrub, with arching and drooping branches, that has been assigned to the family Proteaceae. It has loosely spaced, upright, greyish, narrowly egg-shaped to line-shaped leaves, mostly without teeth and flattened globe-shaped flower heads of 5–7 cm (2–2¾ in) across, consisting of mostly creamy, seldom yellow flowers, that curve in the bud to the center of the head. From the center of the flowers emerge curved styles that jointly give the impression of a pincushion. The common name in English is Redelinghuys pincushion. It only occurs in a very small area in the Western Cape province of South Africa. It flowers between July and October. Unlike in related species the flowers are pollinated by hairy-footed gerbils and striped field mice.

== Description ==
Leucospermum arenarium is a low spreading shrub of up to ¾ (2½ ft) high and 1–1½ m (3–5 ft) in diameter, that grows from a single trunk at its base of 4–5 cm (1½–2 in) thick, covered with a smooth grey bark. The flowering stems are lax, arching and drooping to the ground, sometimes even trailing. The leaves on the flowering stems are loosely spaced, upright, narrowly egg-shaped to line-shaped, 6–8 cm (2½–3¼ in) long and about 7 mm (¼ in) wide, mostly with an entire margin, rarely with two or three teeth near the tip, the base slightly wedge-shaped and twisted, greyish due to a dense layer of fine crisped hairs.

The flower heads are flattened globe-shaped, 5–7 cm (2–2¾ in) in diameter, mostly individually set but sometimes grouped in pairs at the end of the drooping branches, each on a very short or short stalk of up to 4 cm long. The common base of the flowers in the same head is flattened, wide cone-shaped, both about 1½ cm (0.6 in) long and wide. The bracts that subtend the head are carmine-red in colour, oval with a pointy, sometimes slightly hooked tip, 8–10 mm (0.32-0.40 in) long and about 6 mm (0.24 in) wide, papery inconsistency, covered in very fine powdery hairs, which can be lost with age, and the edges set with a regular row of straight equal hairs.

The bract that subtends each flower individually is inverted lance-shaped with a suddenly pointed tip (acuminate), about 12 mm (0.48 in) long and 4 mm (0.16 in) wide, cartilaginous in consistency, with a very densely woolly base and a silky-hairy tip. The 4-merous perianth is mostly pale cream-coloured, rarely golden yellow, 2–2½ cm (0.8–1.0 in) long, very strongly curved towards the center of the head while in the bud. The lowest, fully merged, part of the perianth, called tube is about 7 mm (0.28 in) long, cylinder-shaped, hairless at the base, but with soft, long hairs higher up. The middle part (or claws), where the perianth is split lengthwise and sigmoidally coils tightly when the flower opens, is thinly covered in powdery to felty hairs, except for the hairless lobe facing the center of the head. The upper part (or limbs), which enclosed the pollen presenter in the bud consists of four line- to narrowly lance-shaped lobes with a pointy tip of about 4 mm (0.16 in) long, which are covered in silky hairs. The yellow anthers lack a filament and are directly fused to the limbs, narrowly lance-shaped to linear, with a pointy tip and a pointed expansion at the tip. From the perianth emerges an initially pale ivory to greenish-yellow (eventually pinkish carmine) style of 3–3½ cm (1.2–1.4 in) long that is tapering towards the end, strongly bent to the center of the head. The thickened part at the tip of the style called pollen presenter is greenish near the tip, cylinder-shaped with a pointy tip and about 2½ mm (0.1 in) long, with a groove acting as the stigma across the tip. The ovary is subtended by four awl-shaped, opaque scales.

The flowers are nutty to yeasty scented.

=== Differences with related species ===
L. arenarium can be distinguished from other species of sandveld pincushion by its long, inwardly curved, C-shaped styles of 3–3.5 cm (1.2–1.4 in) long, the mostly creamy, relatively large inflorescences of 5–7 cm (2.0–2.8 in) across, the papery involucral bracts with pointed and hooked tips, and its lax arching and drooping habit.

== Taxonomy ==
As far as is known, a Mrs. M.L. Thomas was the first to collect the Redelinghuys pincushion in August 1958. Hedley Brian Rycroft described the species in the following year.

L. arenarium has been assigned to the section Leucospermum. The species name arenarium is Latin and means "of sandy places".

== Distribution, habitat and ecology ==
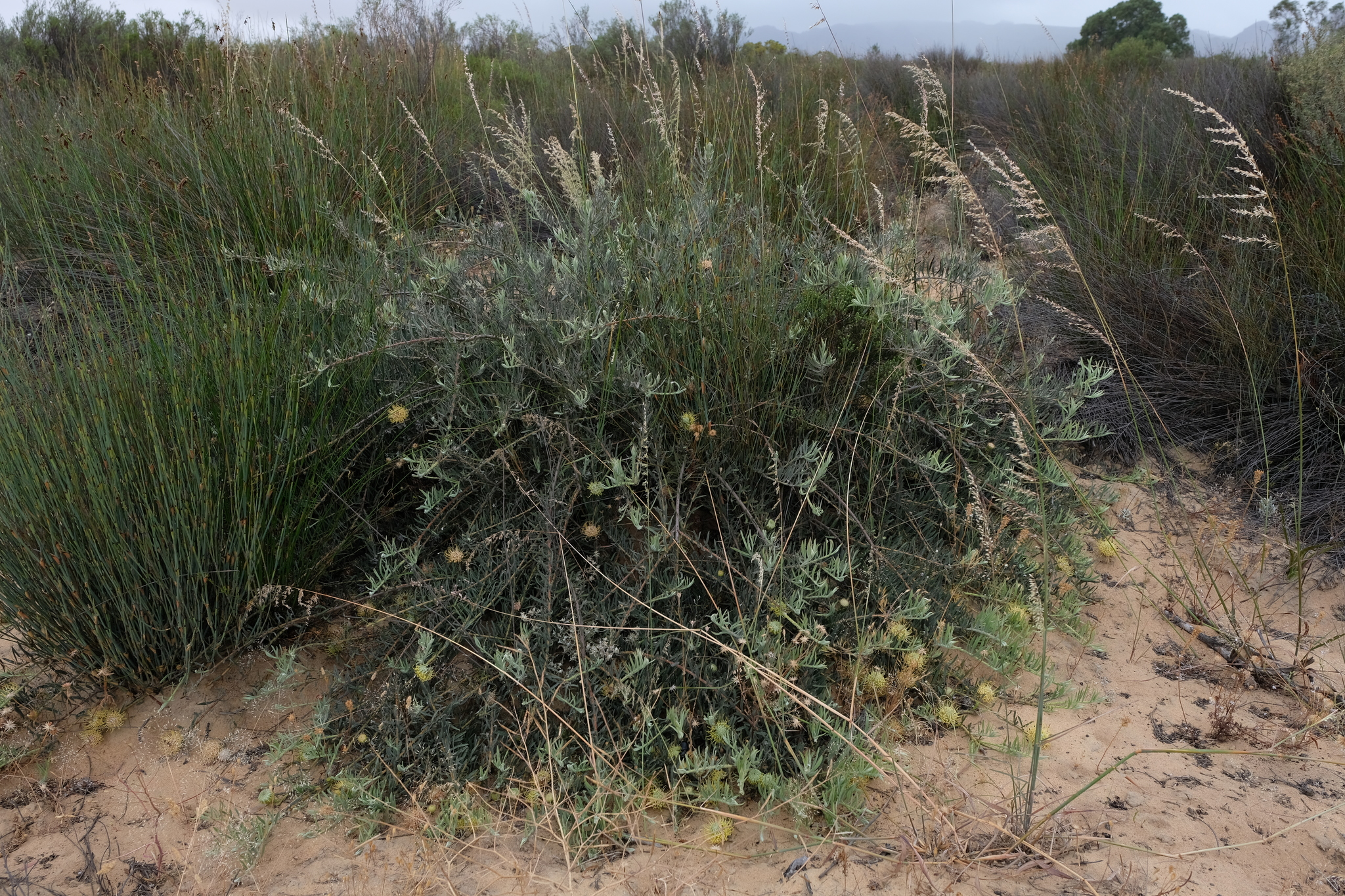
Habit

The Redelinghuys pincushion can be found near the Piketberg where it grows on a level plain at 120–150 m (400–500 ft) altitude, between the Mierberg and the Klein Tafelberg (approximately midway between Redelinghuys and Aurora). The rather widely scattered plants grow in deep white Tertiary sands, in a vegetation that also contains other Proteaceae such as Leucadendron pubescens and Serruria fucifolia, large tufts of the Restionid Willdenowia lucaeana, Rhus rosmarinifolia and Erica (Griesebachia) species. In this area, the average annual precipitation is 250–380 mm (10–15 in), which mainly falls during the winter.

The flowers are pollinated by rodents. Hairy-footed gerbils Gerbillurus paeba, and striped field mice Rhabdomys pumilio were observed to visit the flowers of L. arenarium, and both carried its pollen on forehead and breast. L. arenarium nectar is thick and is present in a cup-like structure at the tips of the perianth lobes. Here, mice can lick it off without having to damage the flowers. While the styles are rather short and straight in the insect-pollinated relatives, the Redelinghuys pincushion has much longer styles that curve strongly towards the center of the head, making the pollen transfer to the mice more effective. The nectar is produced by the scales subtending the ovary as in other Leucospermum species, but is transported by capillary ducts to the tips of the perianth. These adaptations have developed from an ancestor that was adapted to insect pollination, like its nearest relatives. These have narrow perianth tubes, unlike the wide tubes of species specialised for thick bird bills. L. arenarium retained the narrow tube, to make use of its capillary mechanism to transport the nectar. For L. arenarium, rodent pollination is more effective than insect or bird pollination, even though a larger part of the pollen is lost due to the mice grooming their fur. This is probably the result of a larger dedication of the rodents compared to insects and birds.

After the fruits fall from the plants about two months after flowering, these are collected by native ants who transport them to their underground nests. Mature plants do not survive the wildfires that naturally occur in the sandveld, a type of fynbos in which the Redelinghuys pincushion can be found, but it revives from the seeds that remained safe underground.

== Conservation ==
The Redelinghuys pincushion is considered a critically endangered species. It is estimated that 50% of its habitat was already lost due to agricultural expansion by 1992 and a further 30% by approximately 2010. Climate models predict that the suitable habitat for this species will have vanished by 2025.
