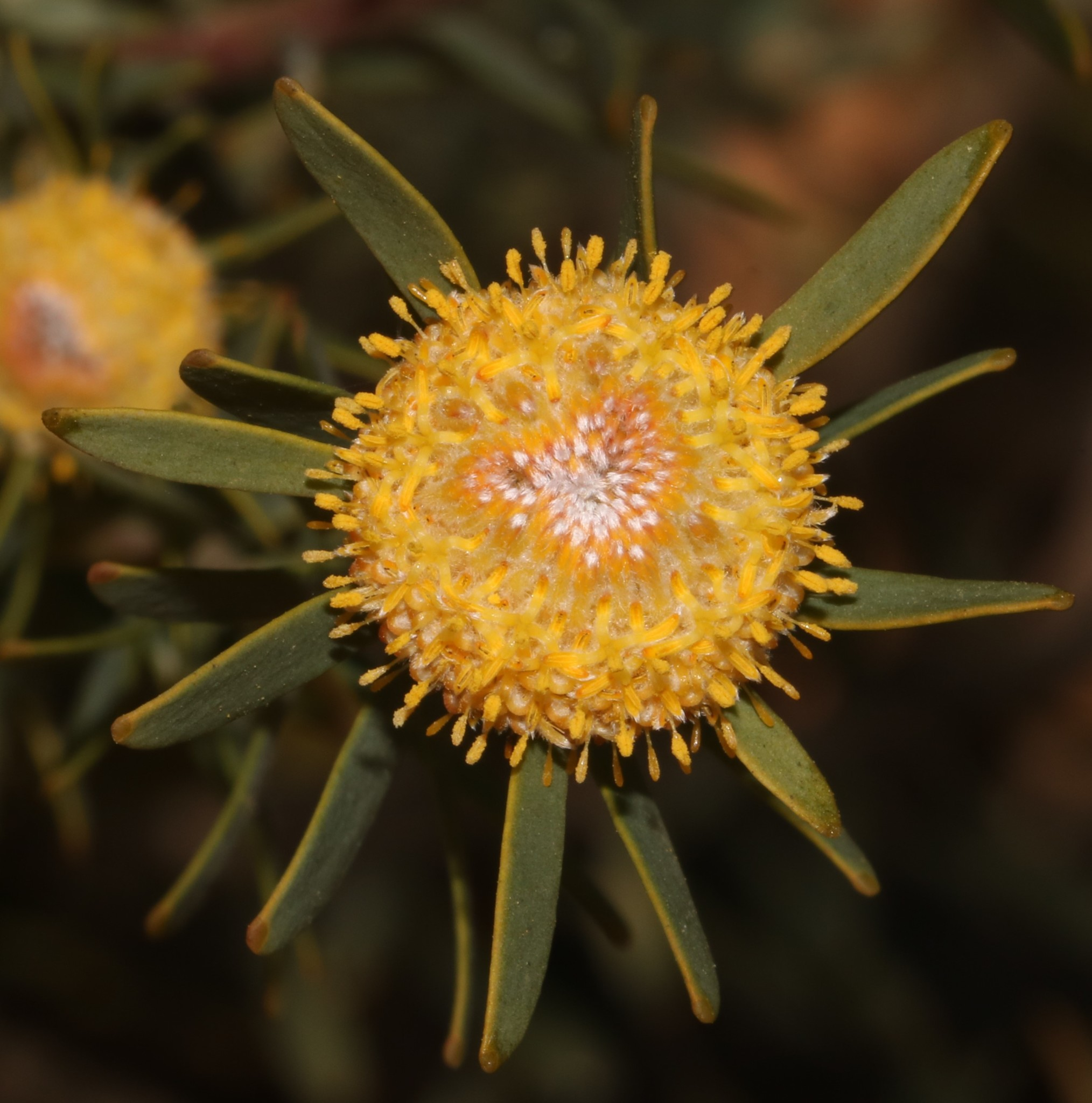

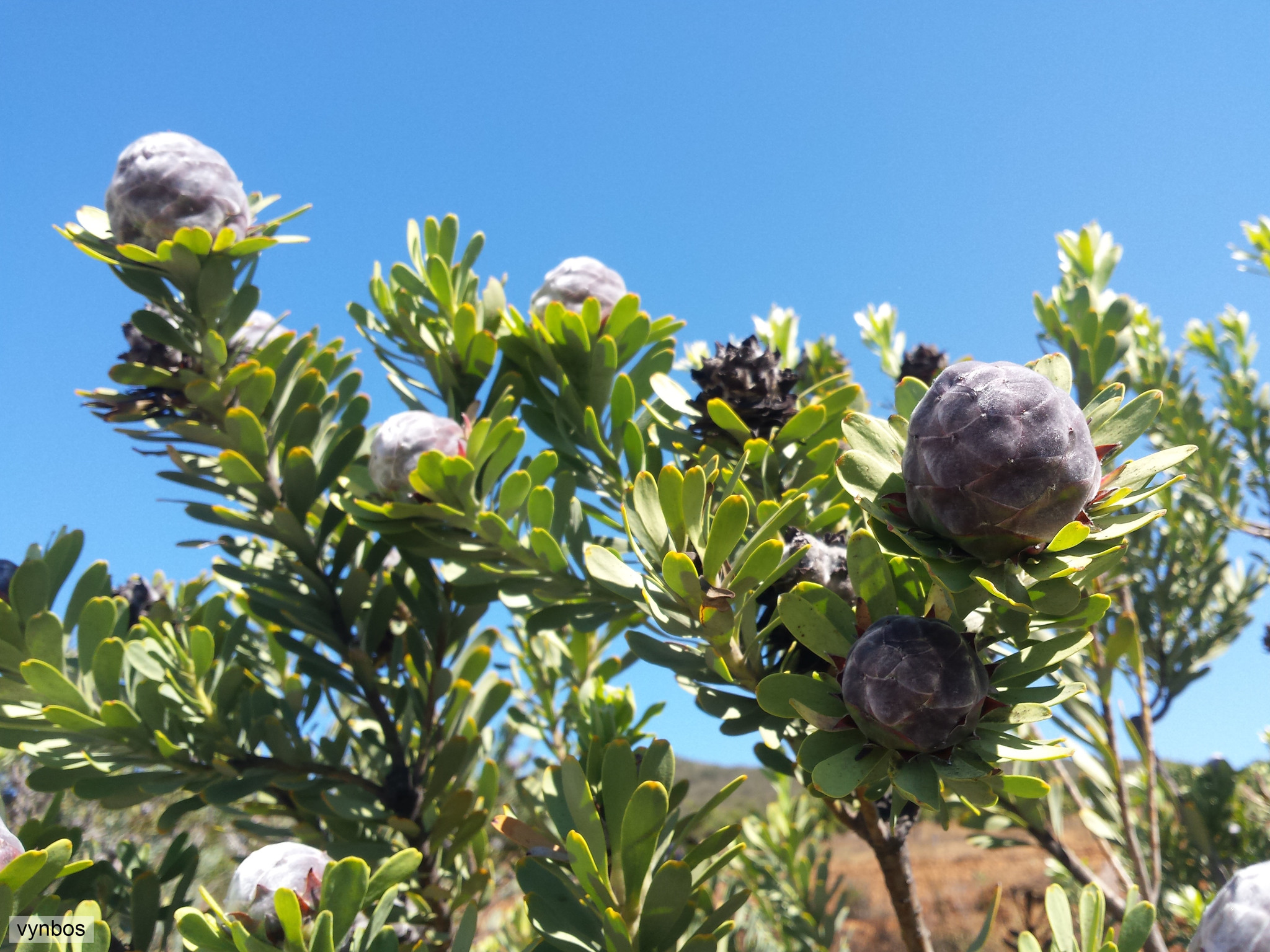

Conservation status
- Least Concern (IUCN 3.1)

Scientific classification
- Kingdom: Plantae
- Clade: Embryophytes
- Clade: Tracheophytes
- Clade: Spermatophytes
- Clade: Angiosperms
- Clade: Eudicots
- Order: Proteales
- Family: Proteaceae
- Genus: Leucadendron
- Species: L. pubescens

Binomial name
- Leucadendron pubescens R.Br.

= Leucadendron pubescens =

Species of plant

Leucadendron pubescens, the grey conebush, is a flower-bearing shrub belonging to the genus Leucadendron and forms part of the fynbos. The plant is native to the Western Cape where it occurs on the Bokkeveldeskarp, Gifberg, Cederberg, Piketberg, Olifantsrivier, Sandveld, Koue Bokkeveld, Hexrivierberge, Bonteberg as well as the Kwadouwberg, Witteberg and Touwsberg.

The shrub grows 2.5 m tall and flowers from June to October but mainly in July. The plant dies in a fire but the seeds survive. The seeds are stored in a toll on the female plant, first fall to the ground after a fire and are spread by rodents. The plant is unisexual and there are separate plants with male and female flowers, which are pollinated by small beetles. The plant grows mainly in sandstone and quartzite soils at altitudes of 60–1700 m.

In Afrikaans it is known as syhaartolbos.

== Gallery ==
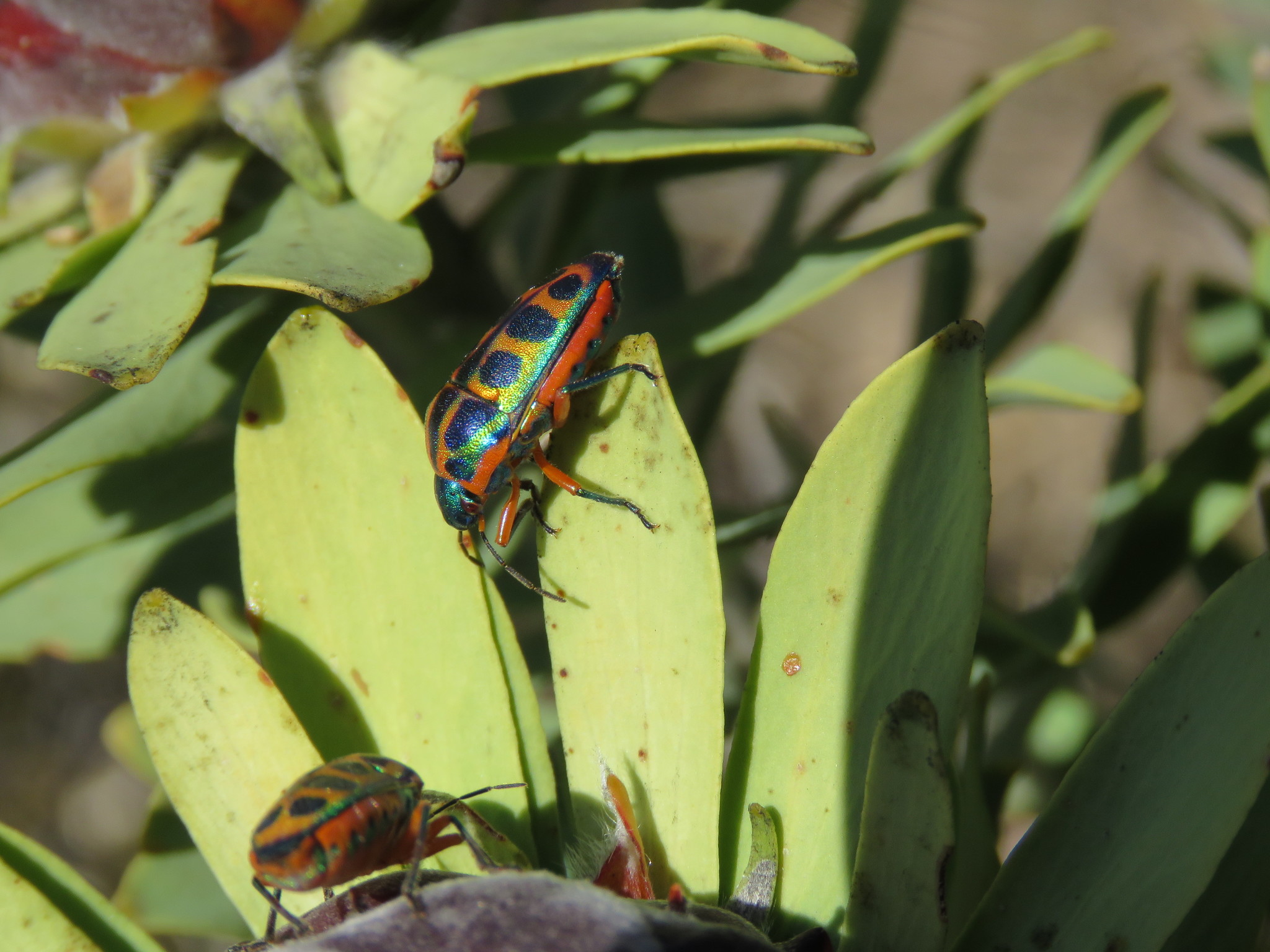

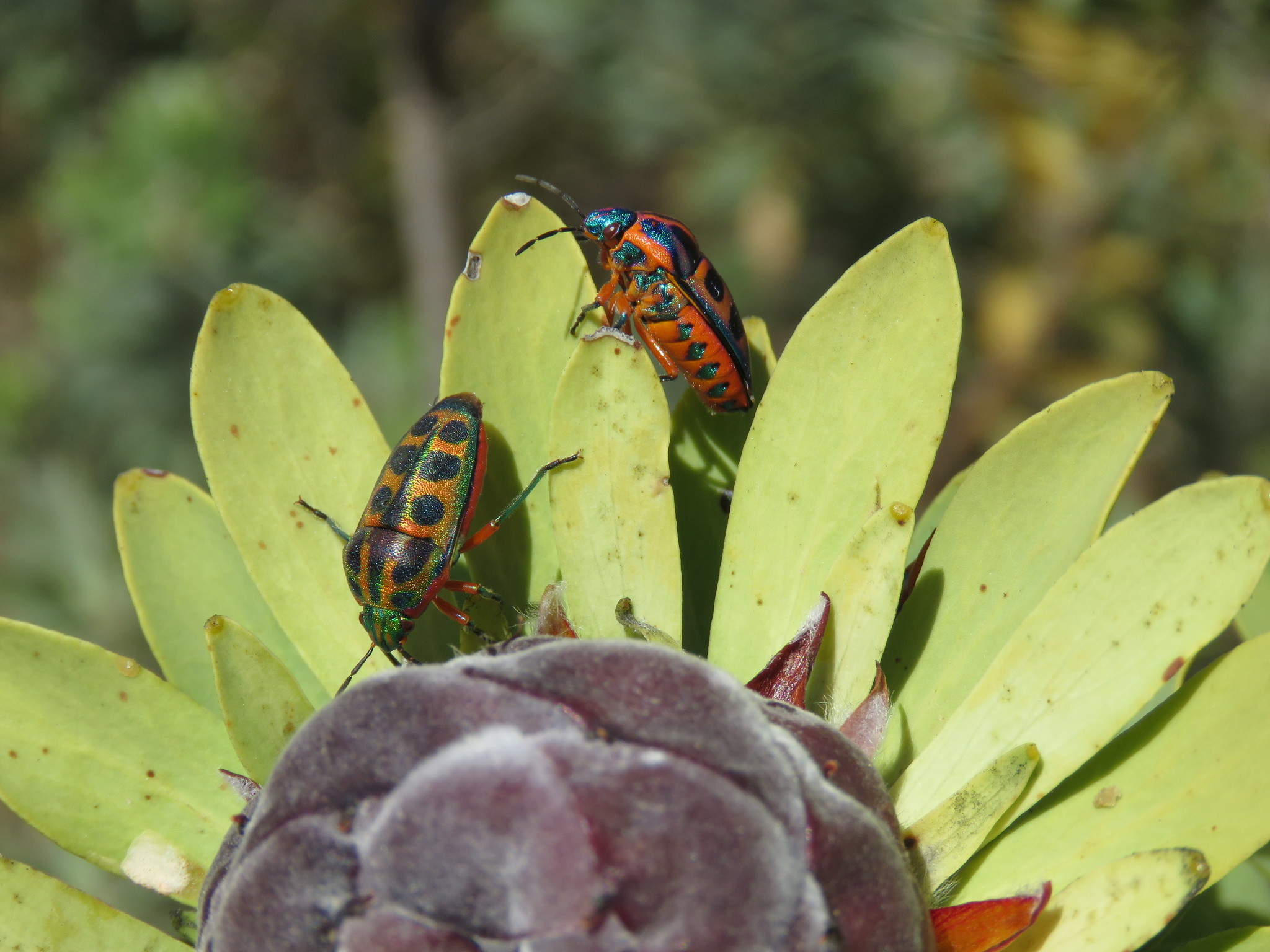

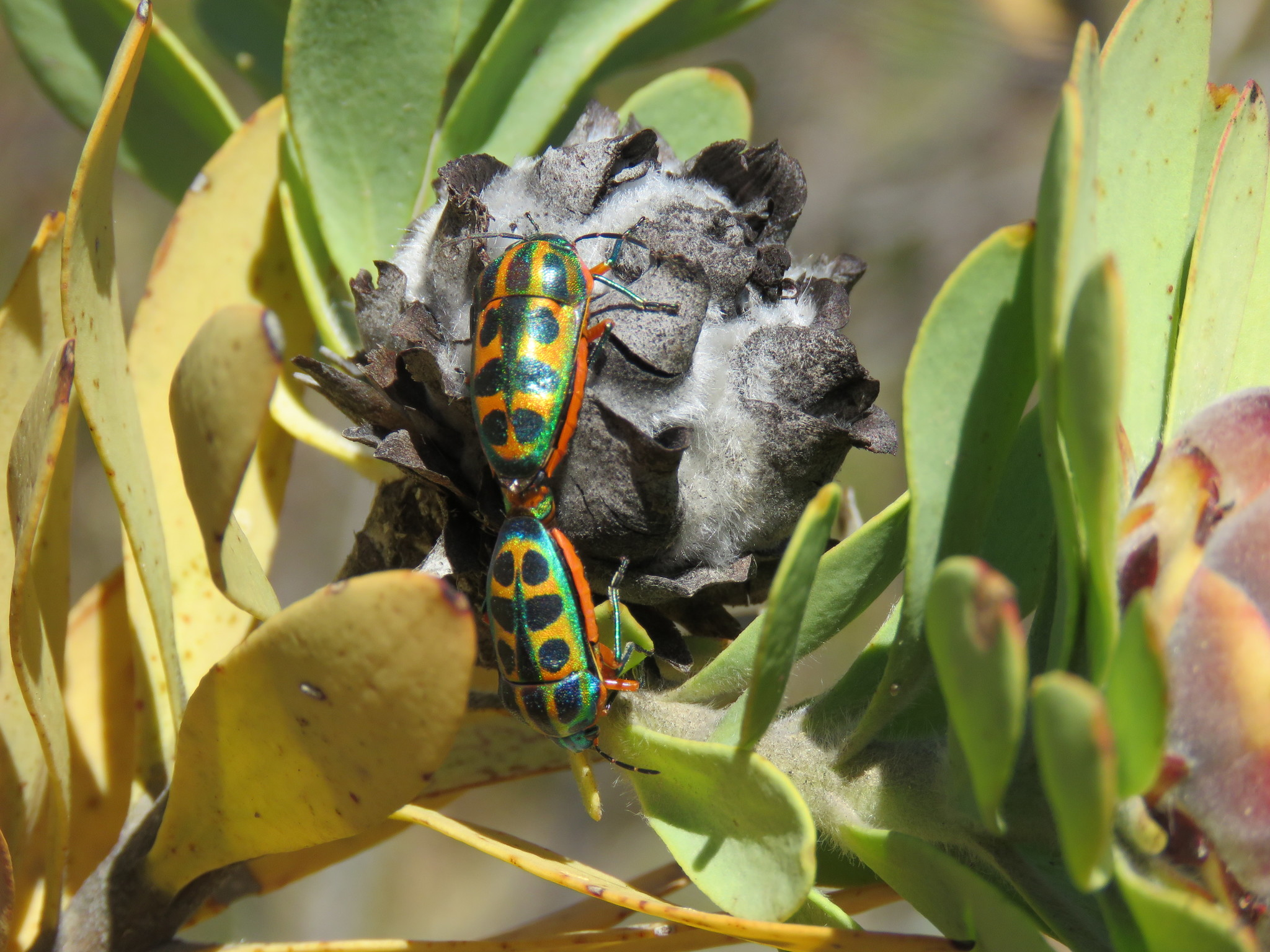

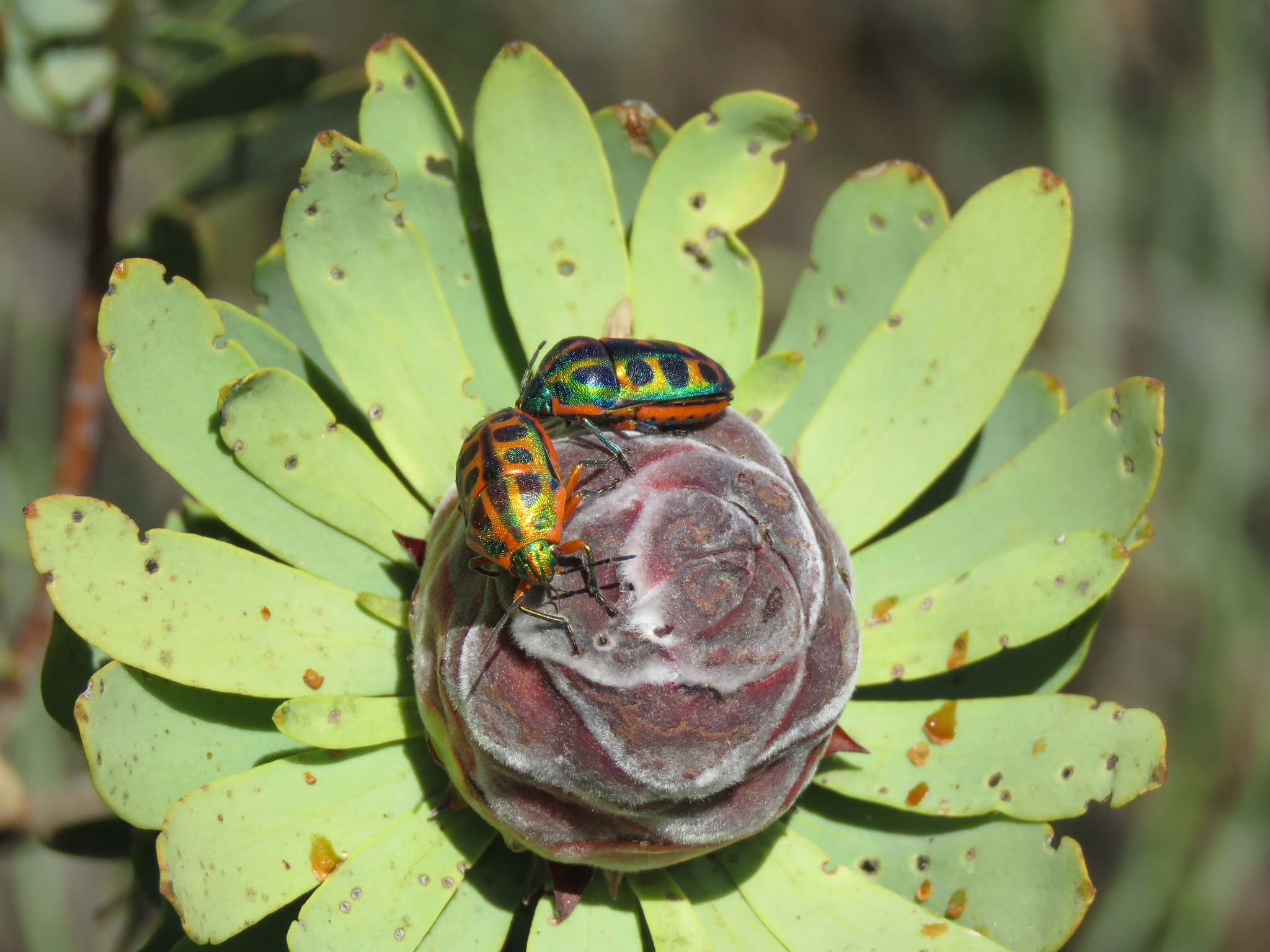

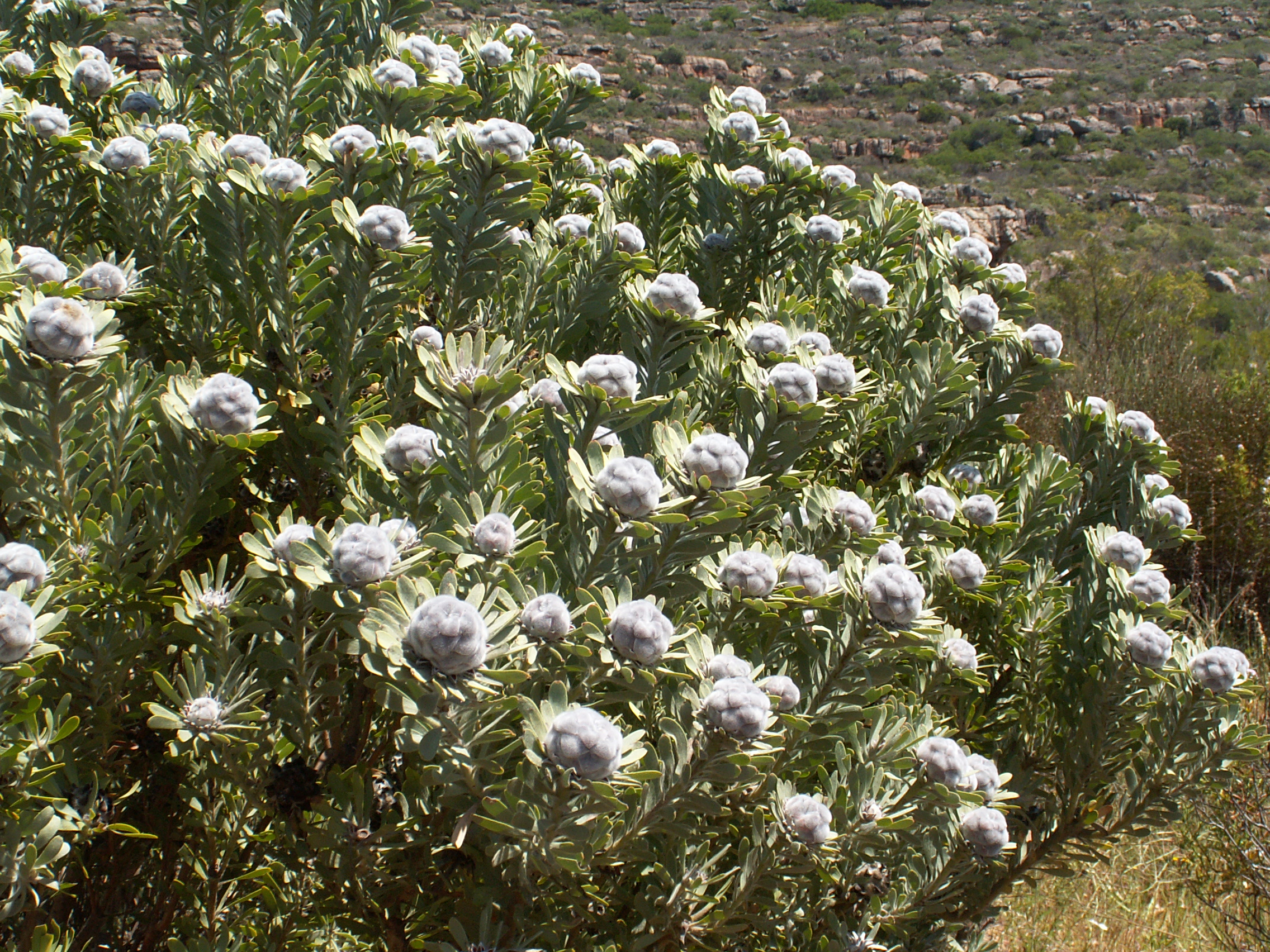

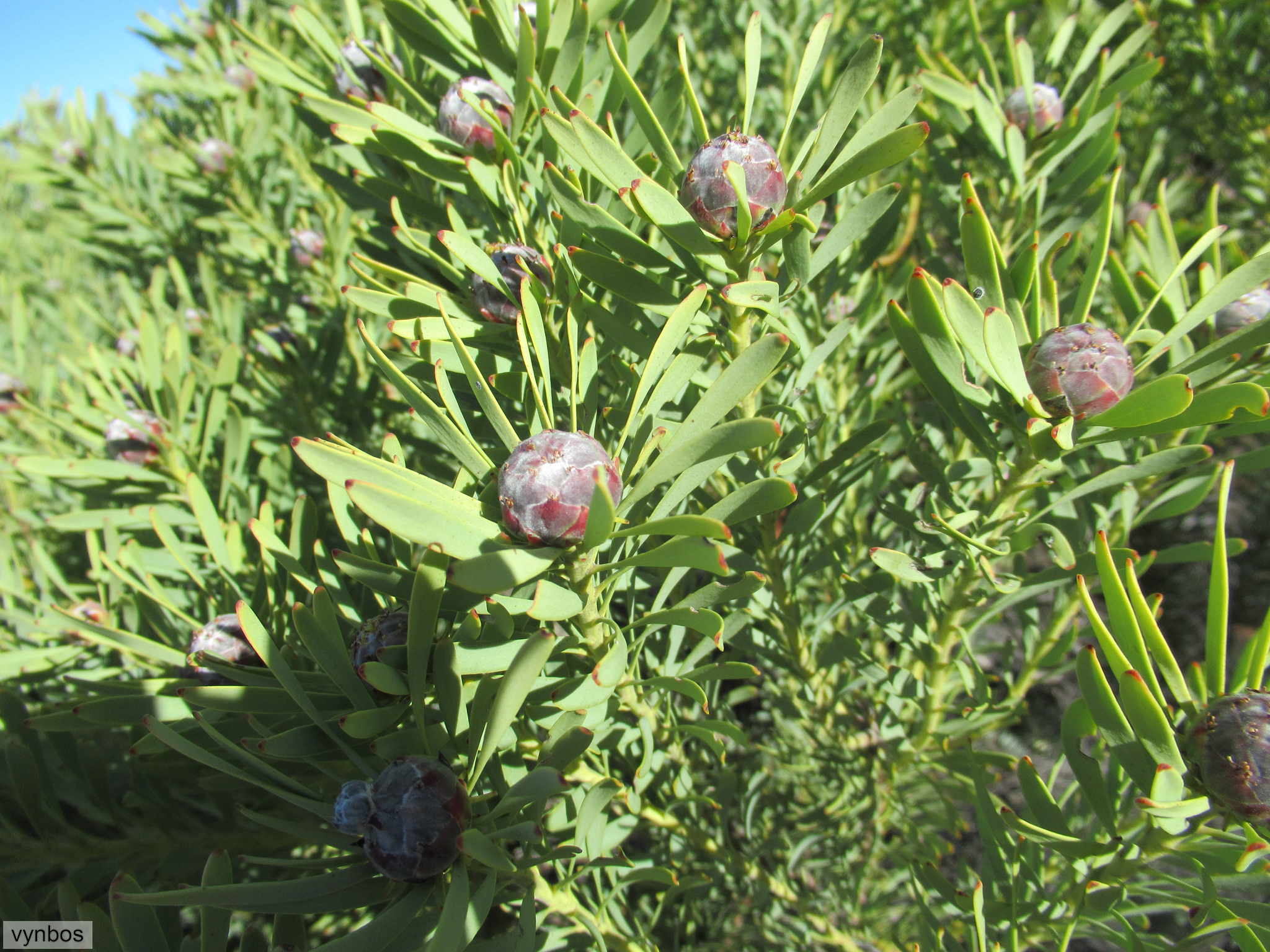

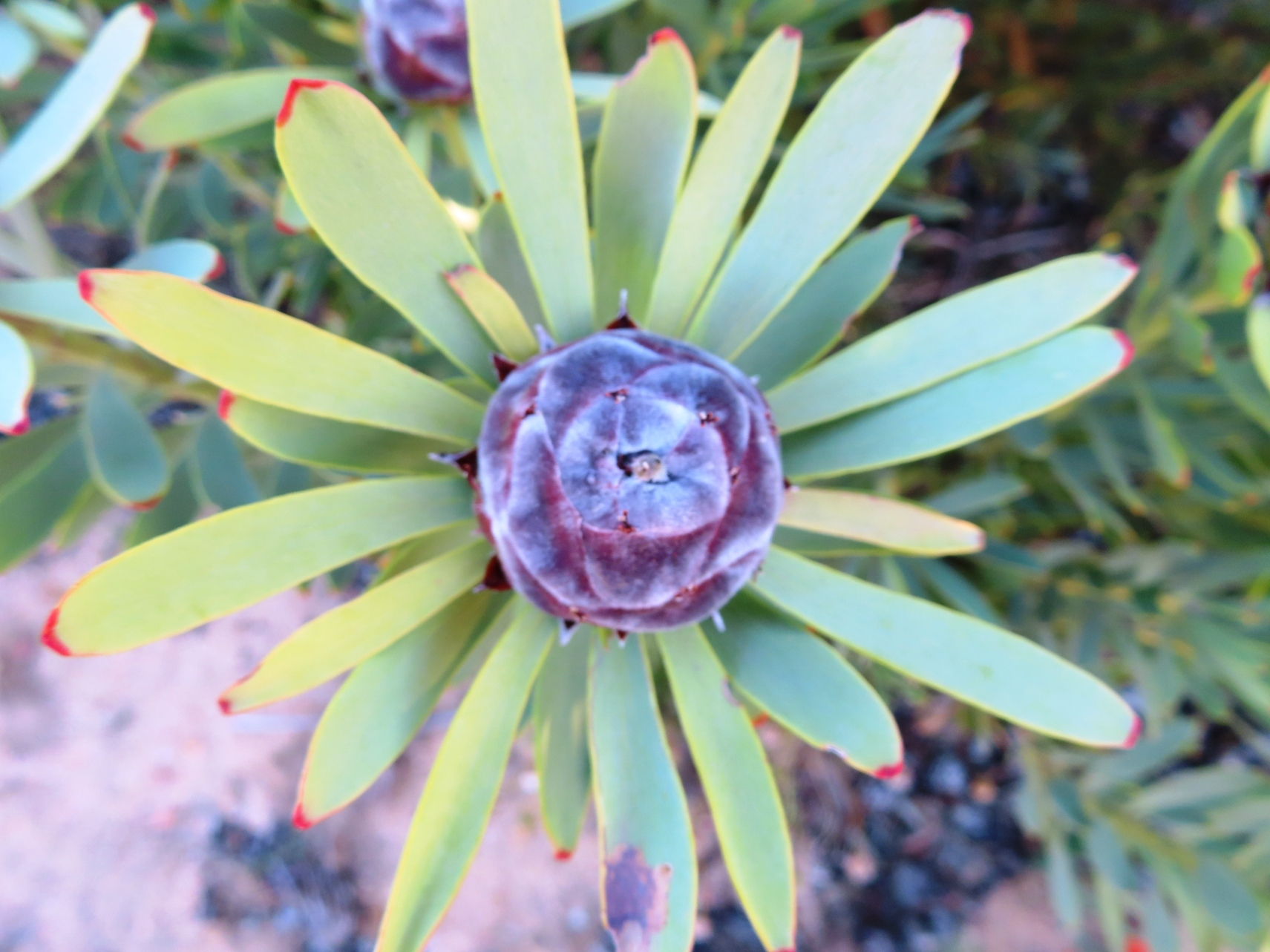

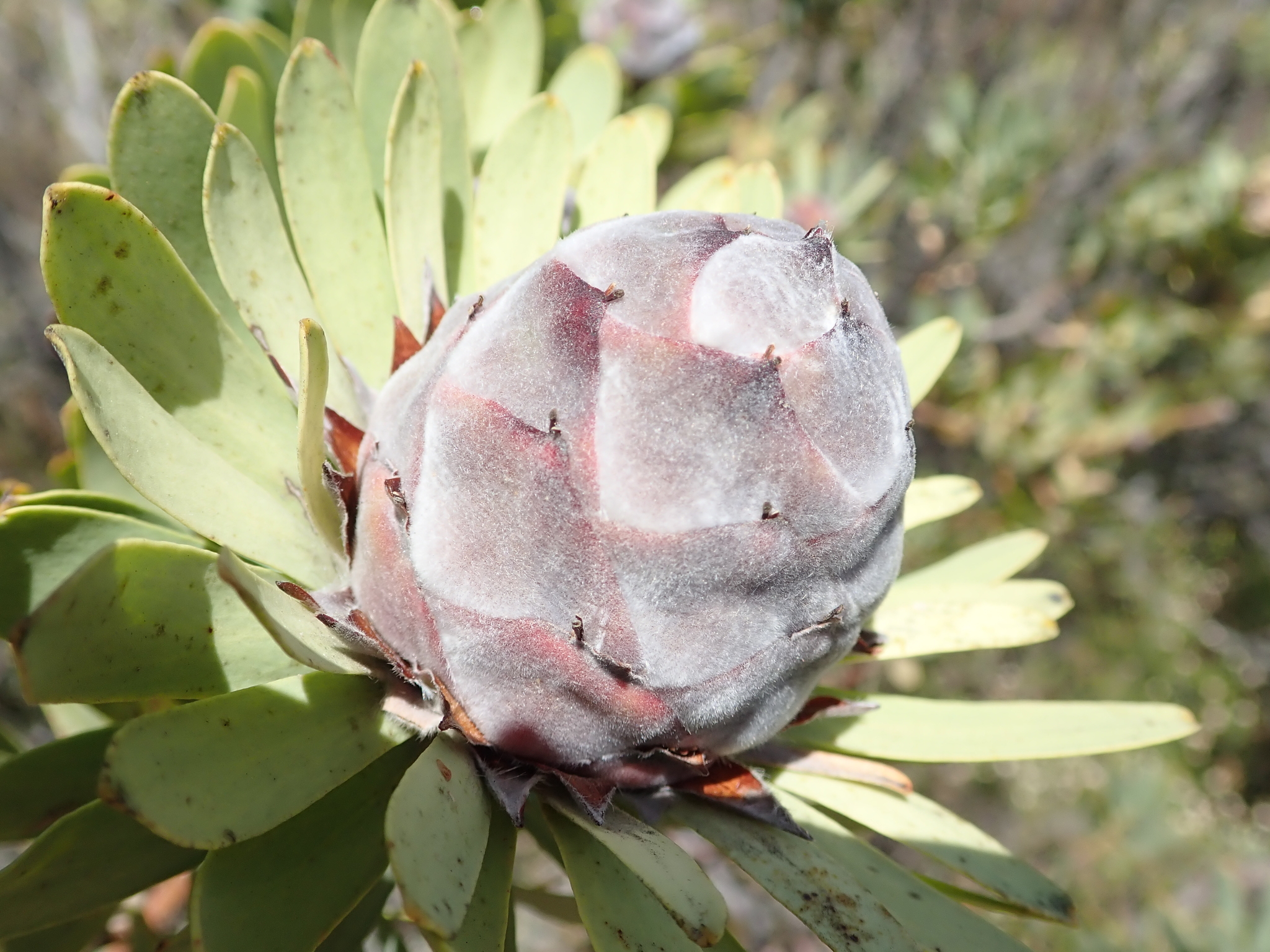

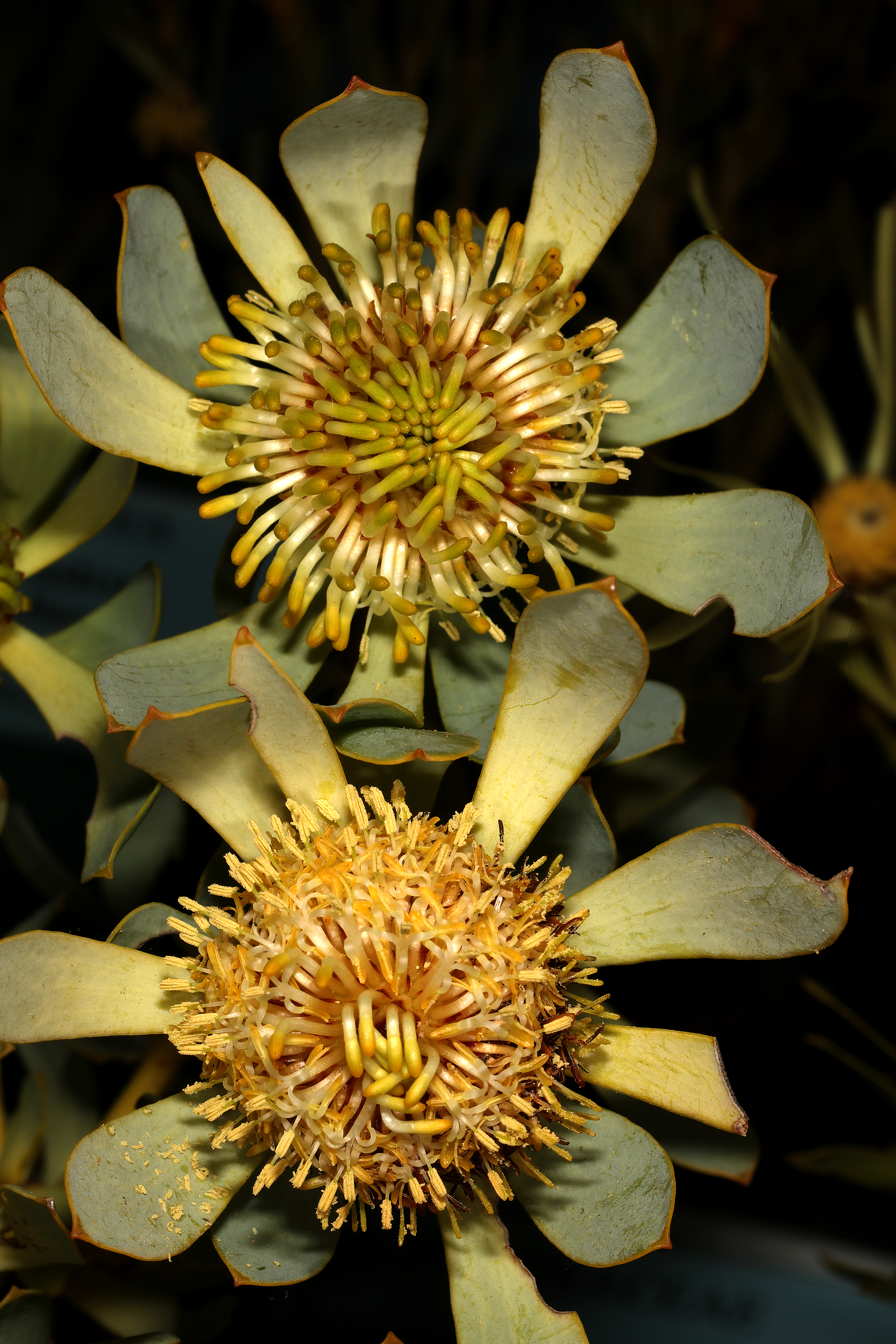

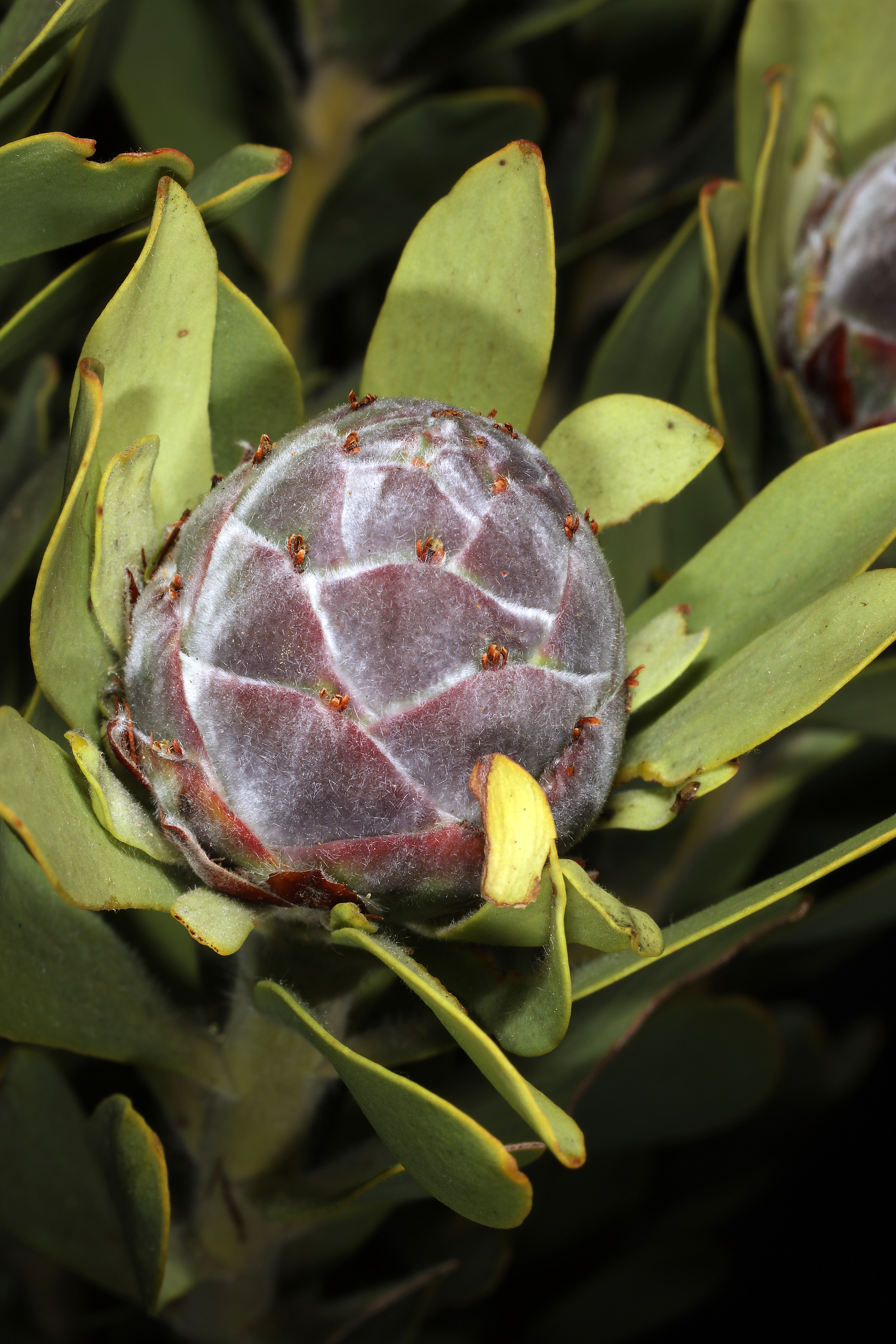

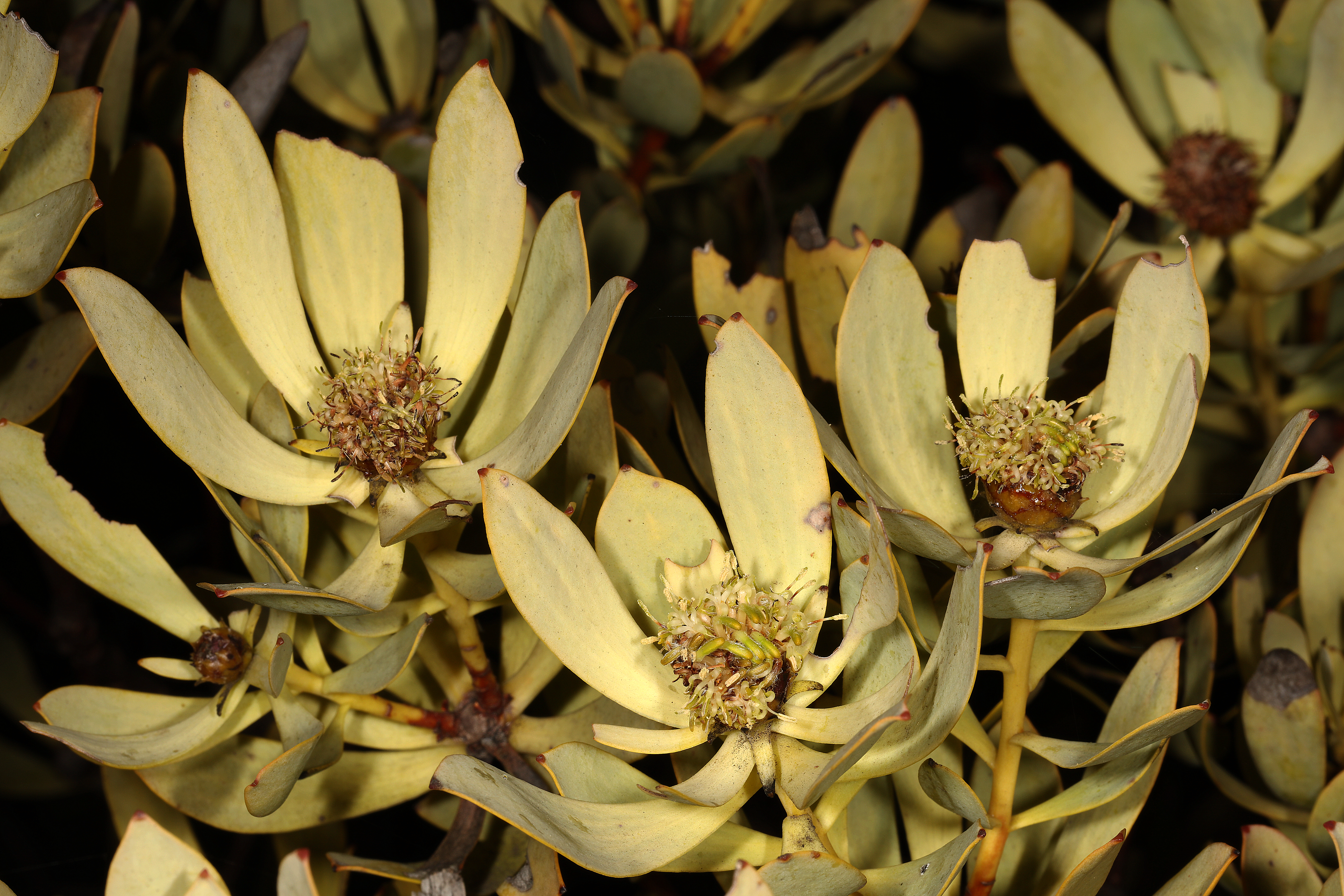

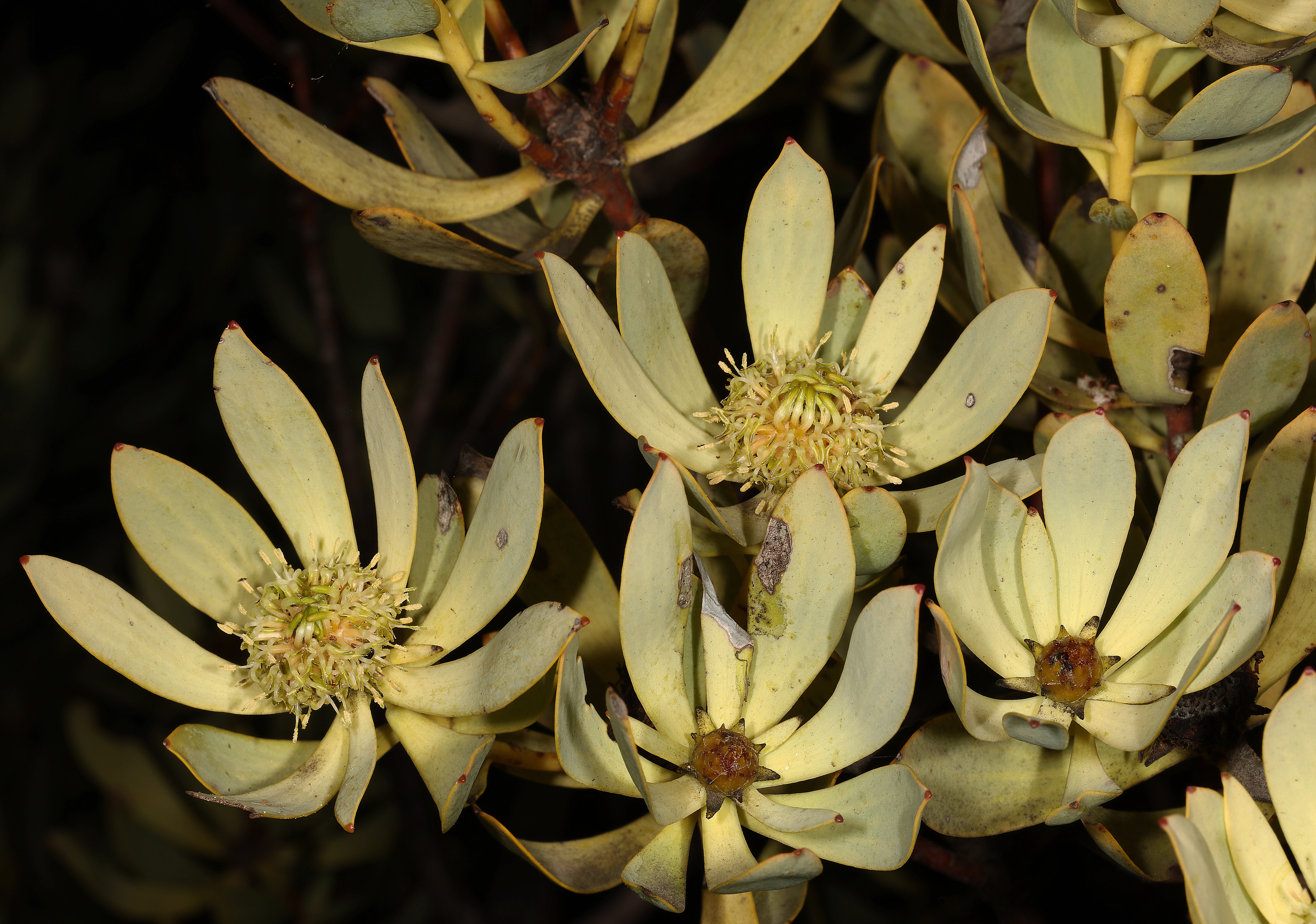

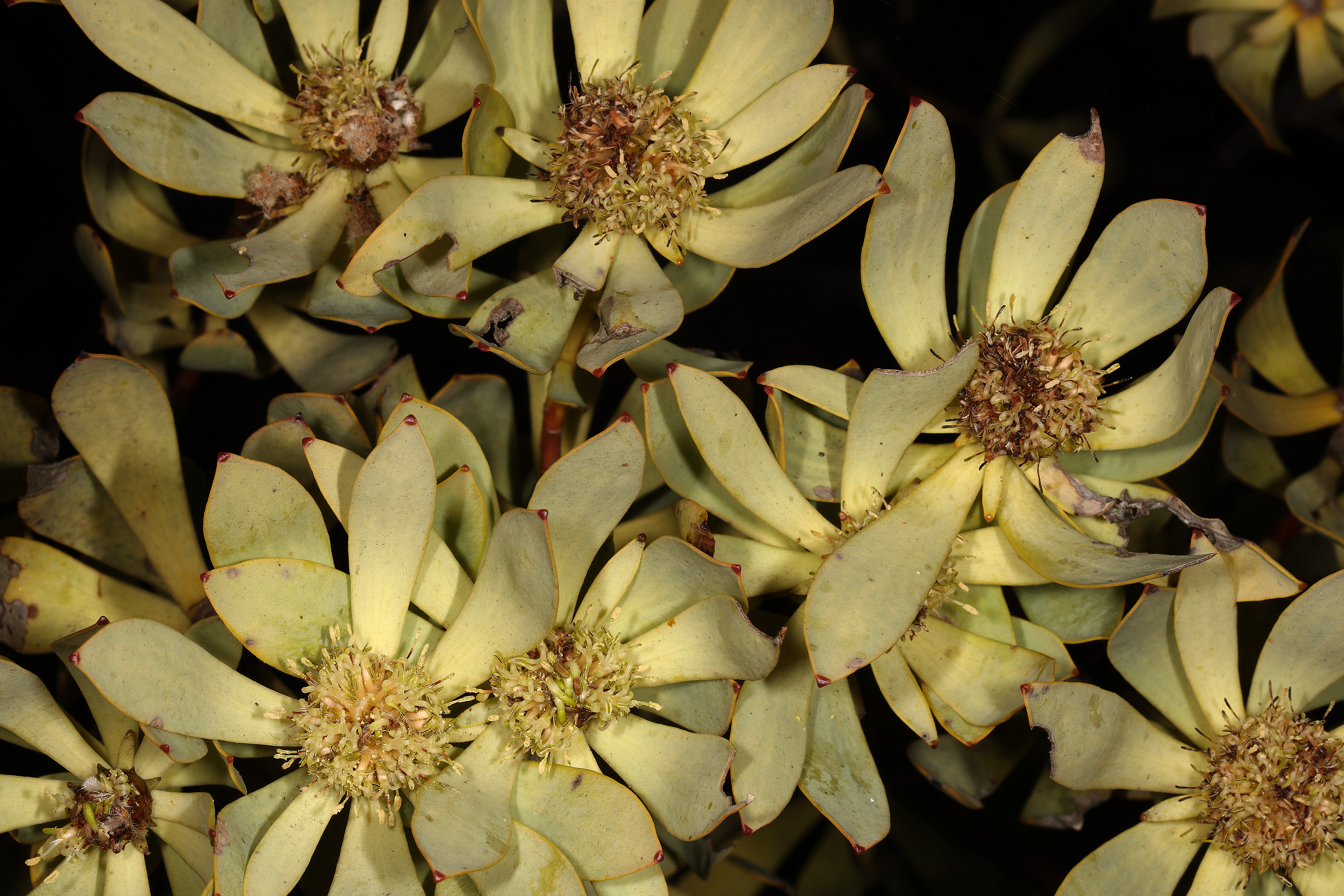

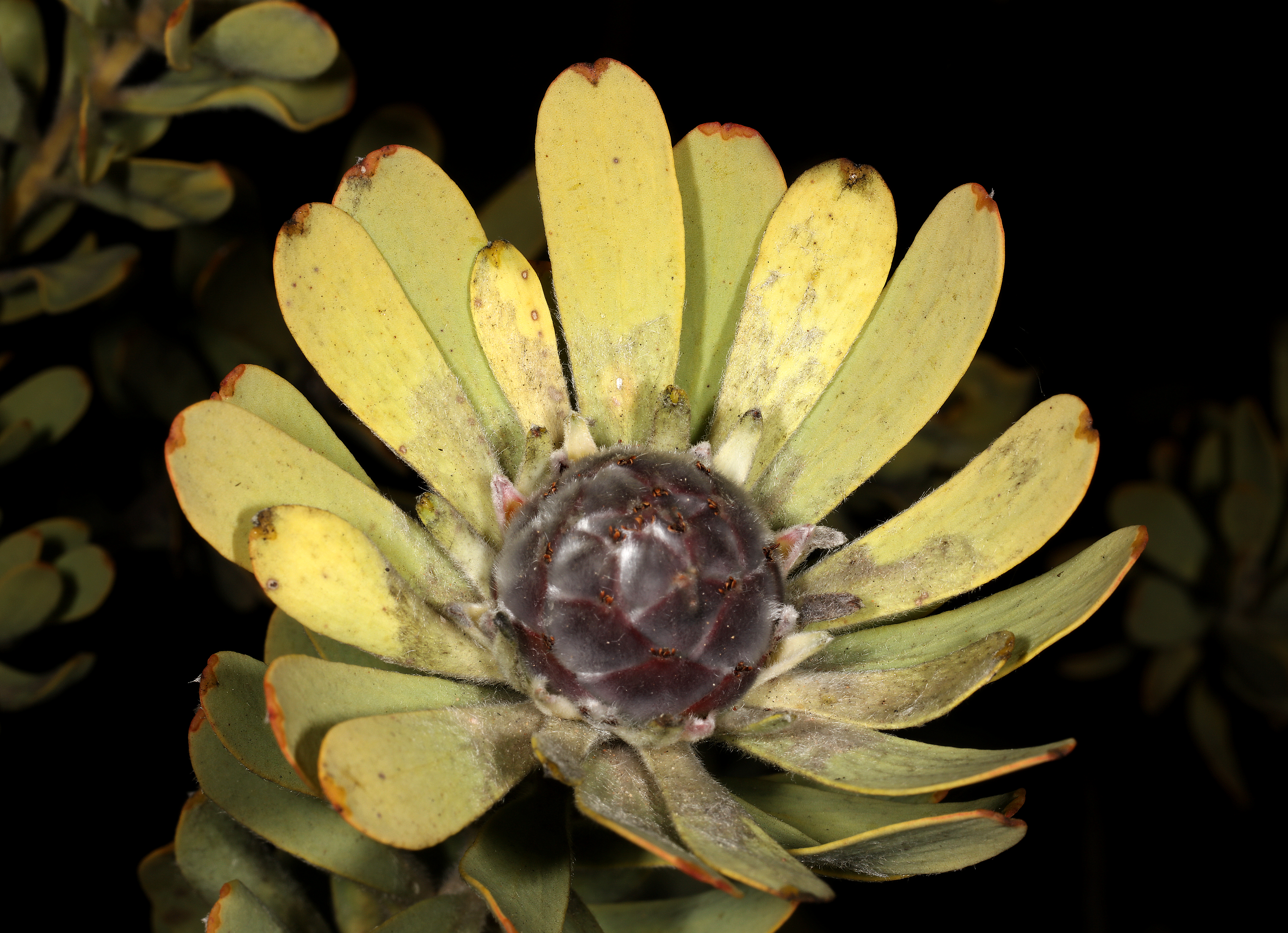

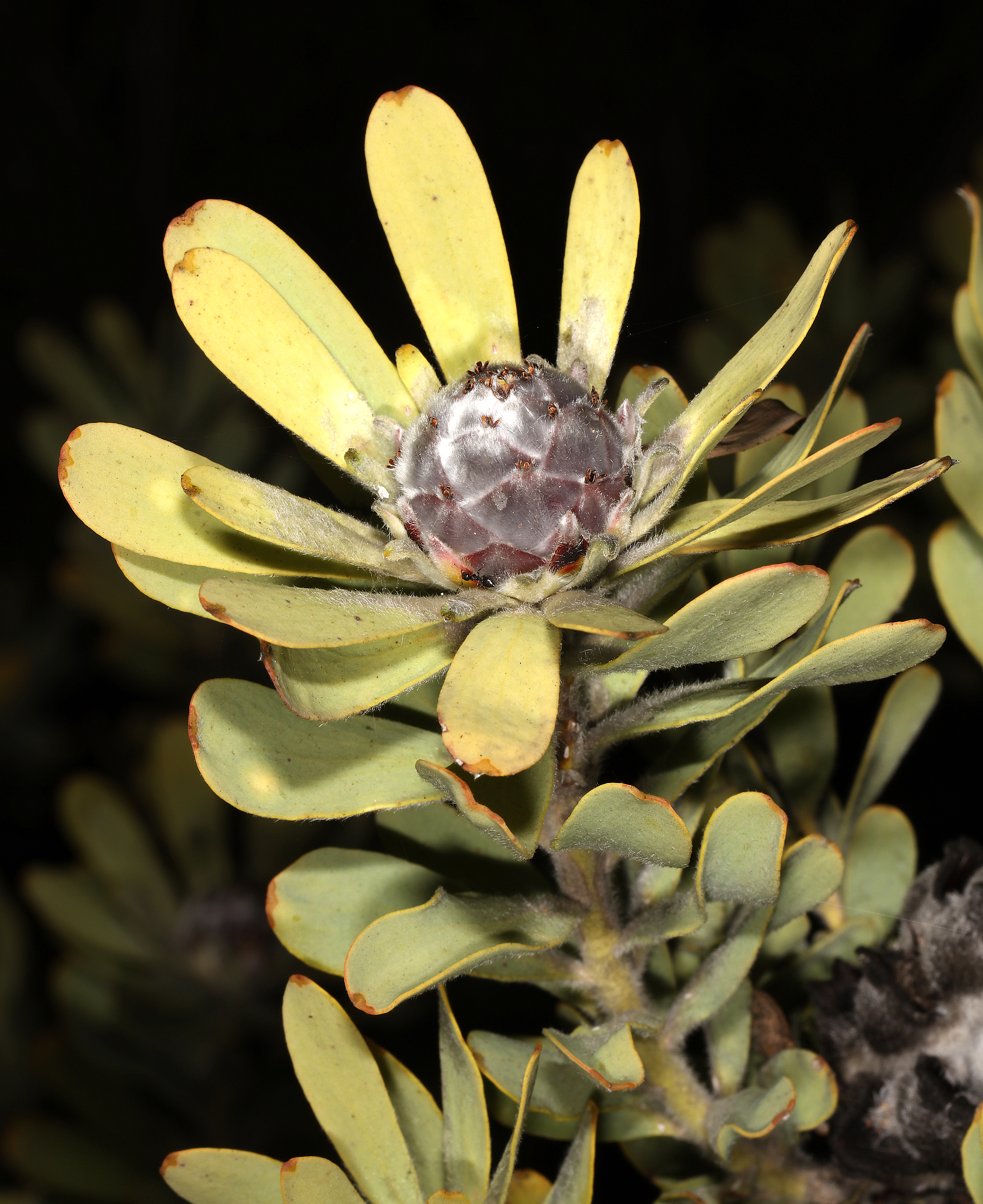

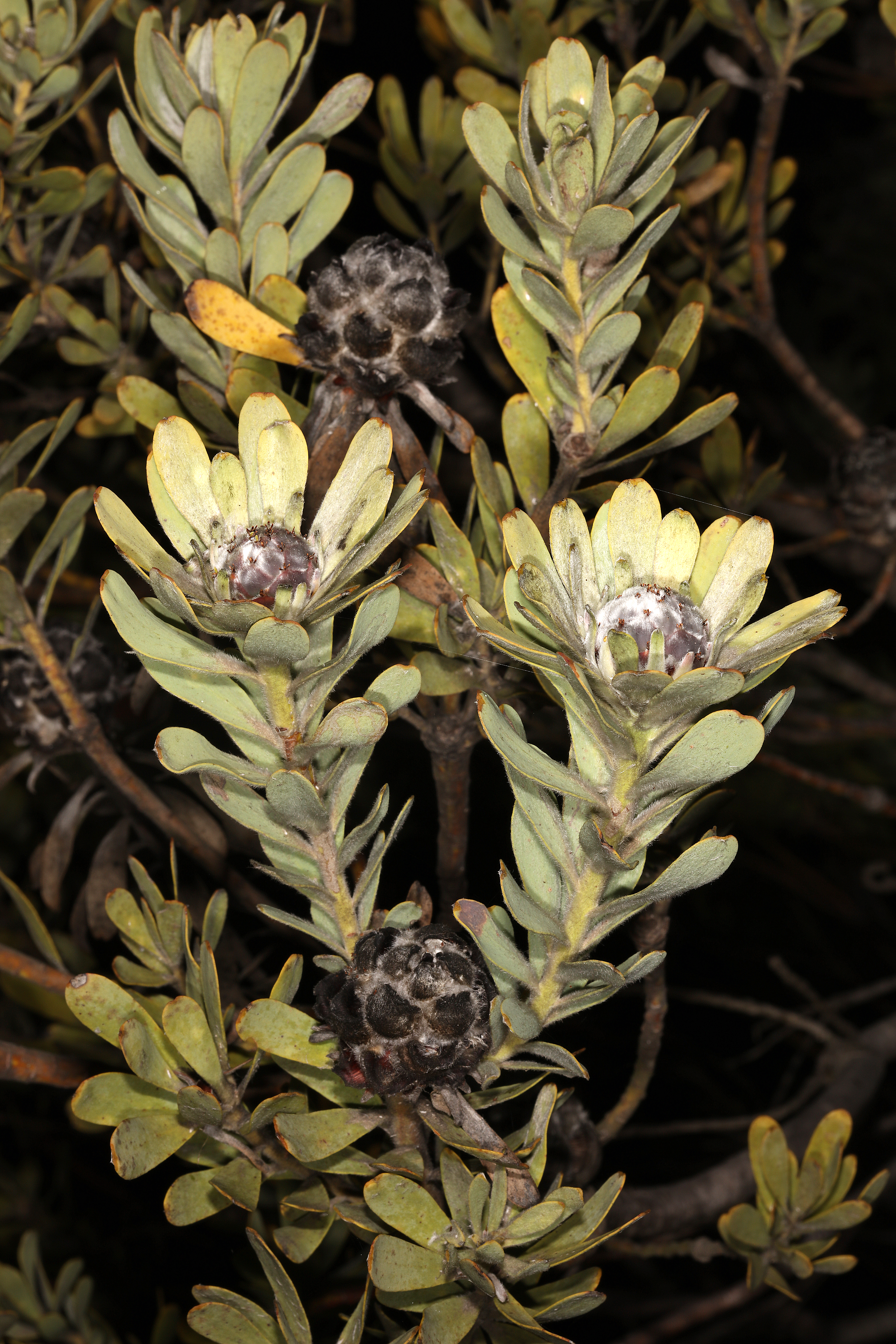

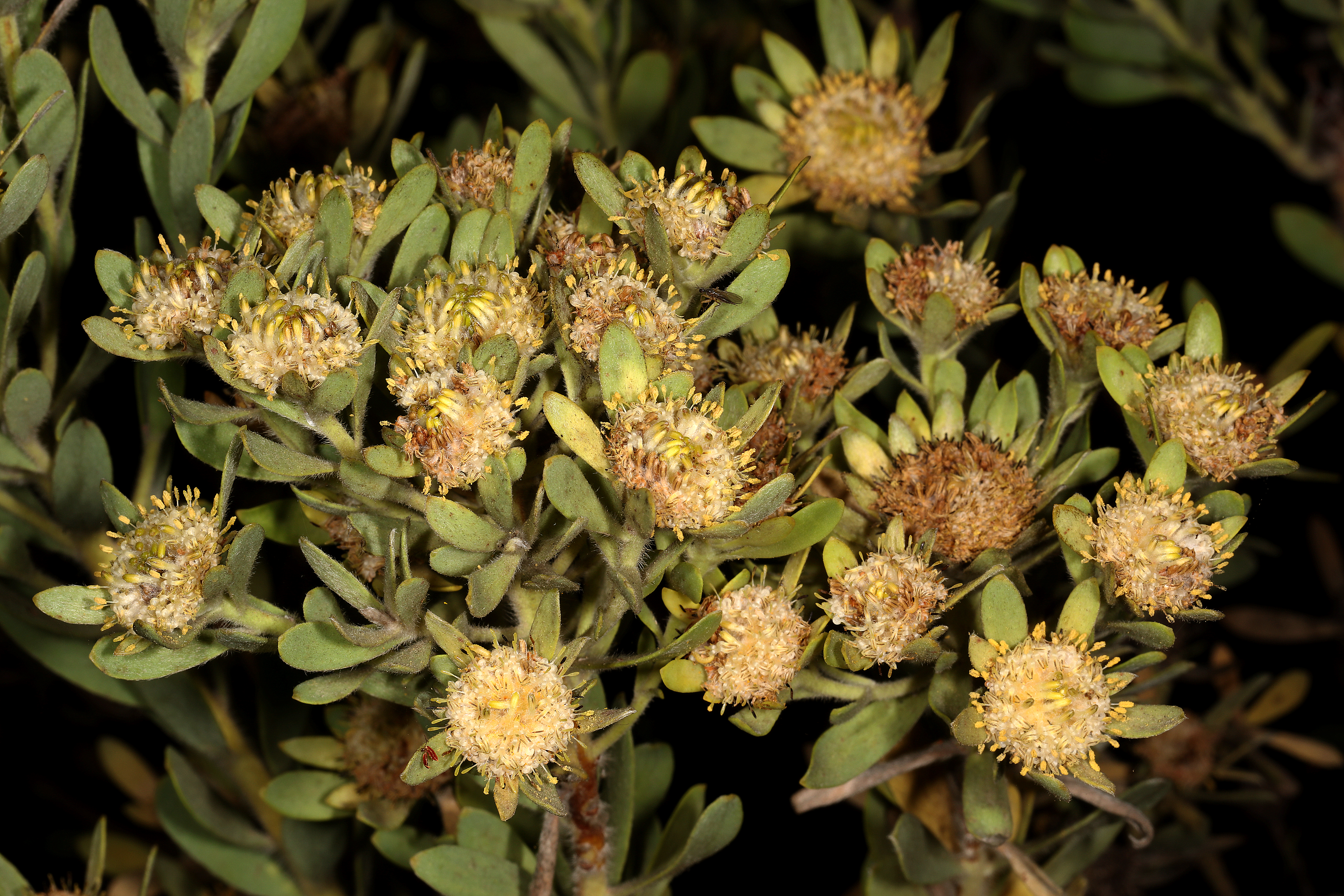

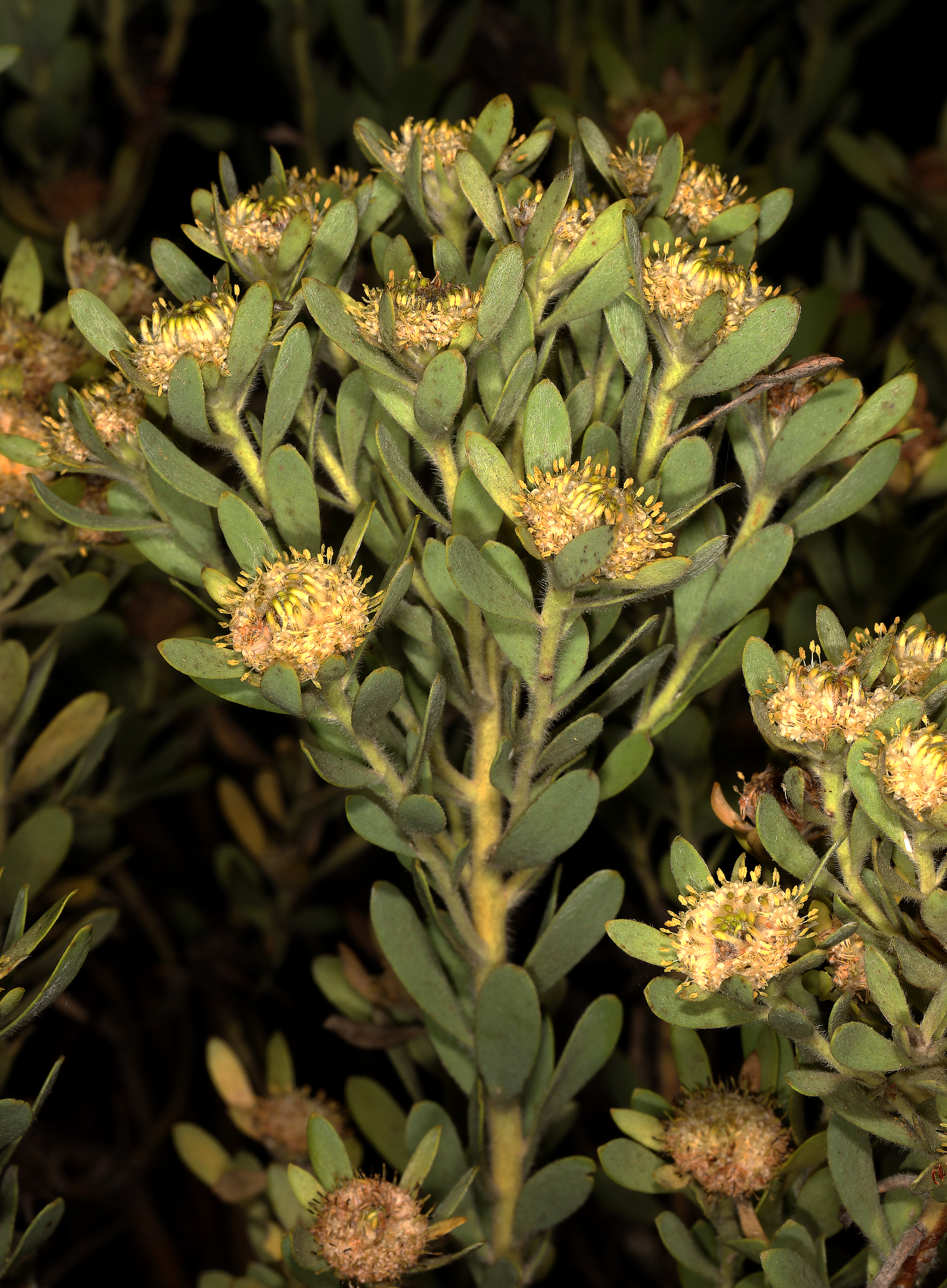

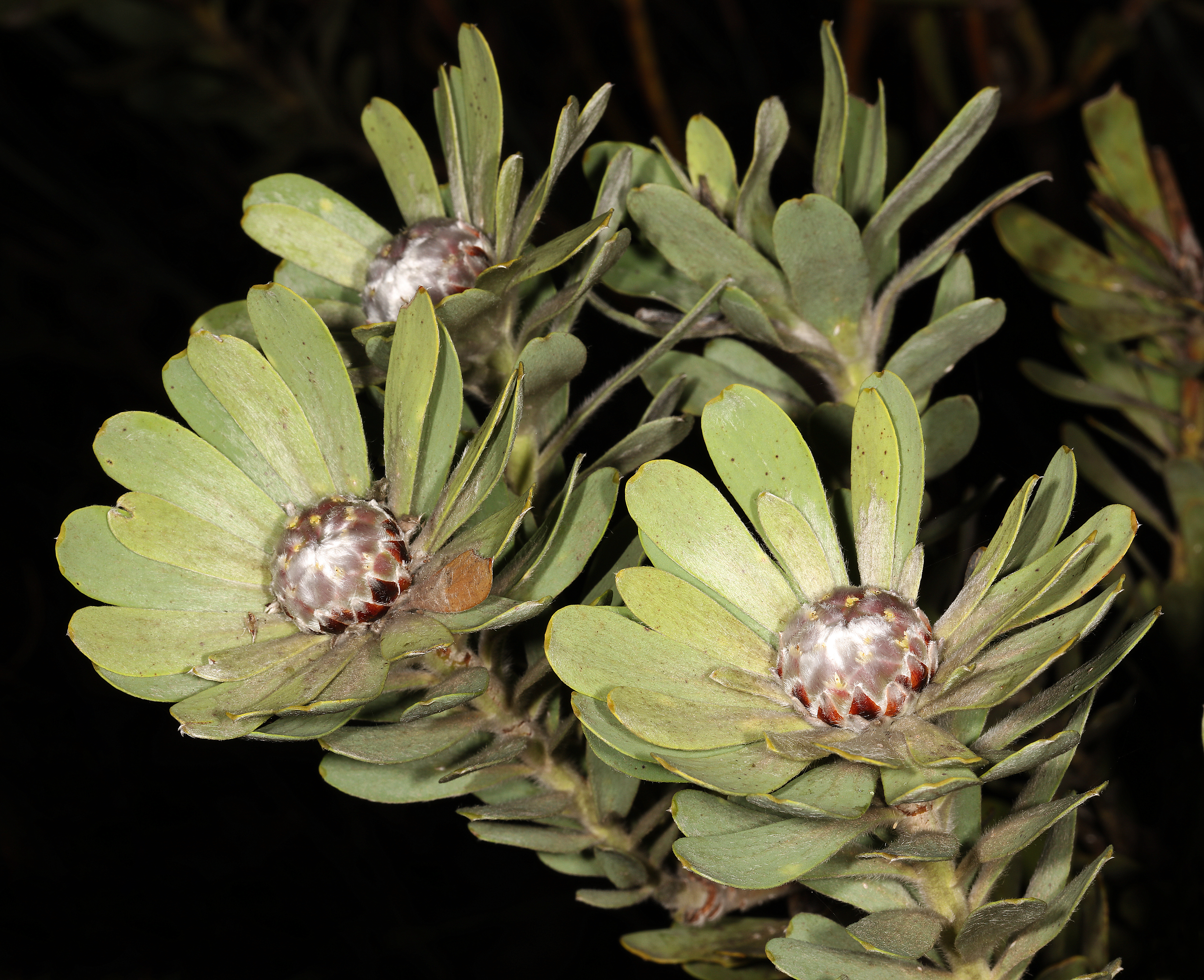

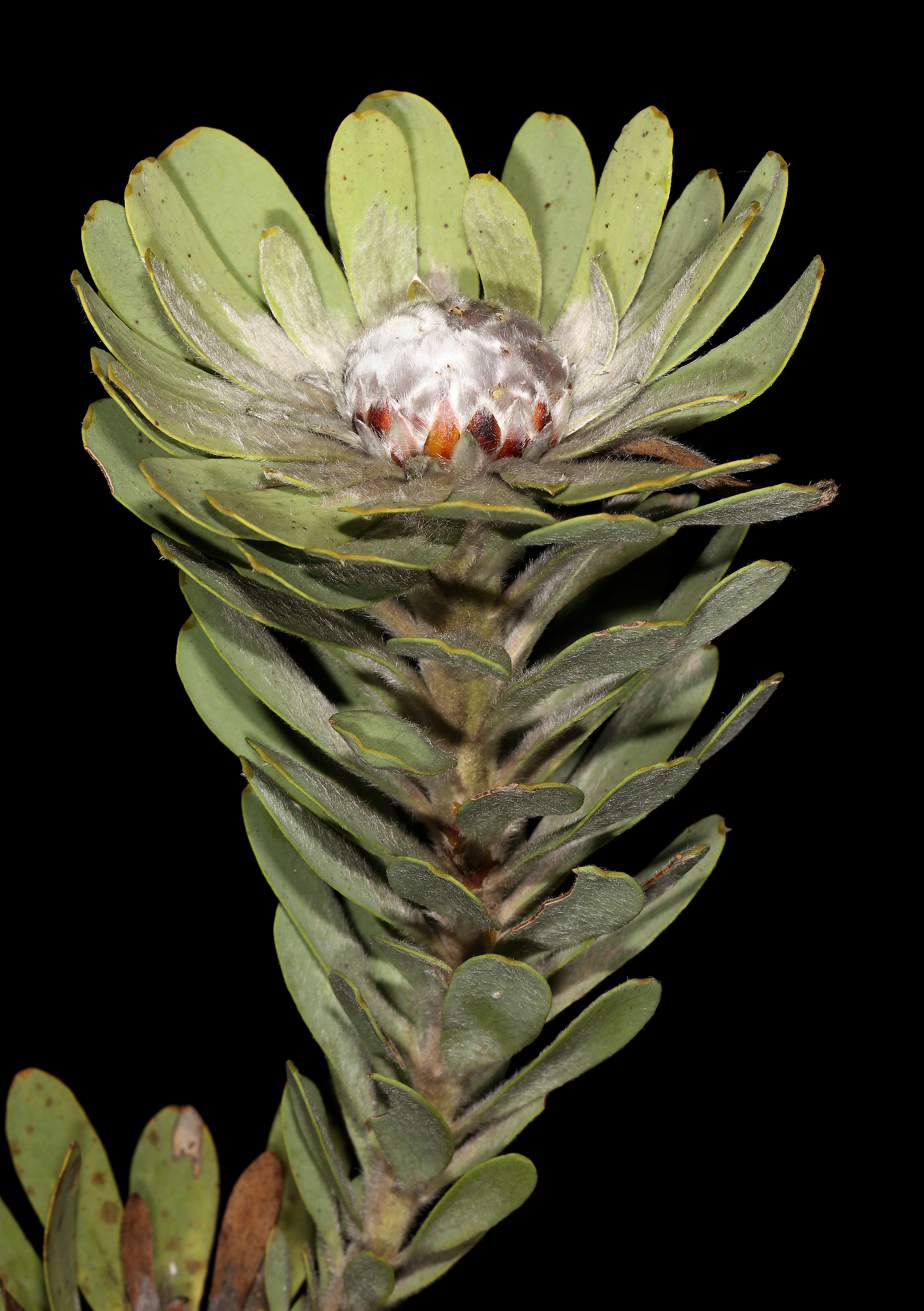

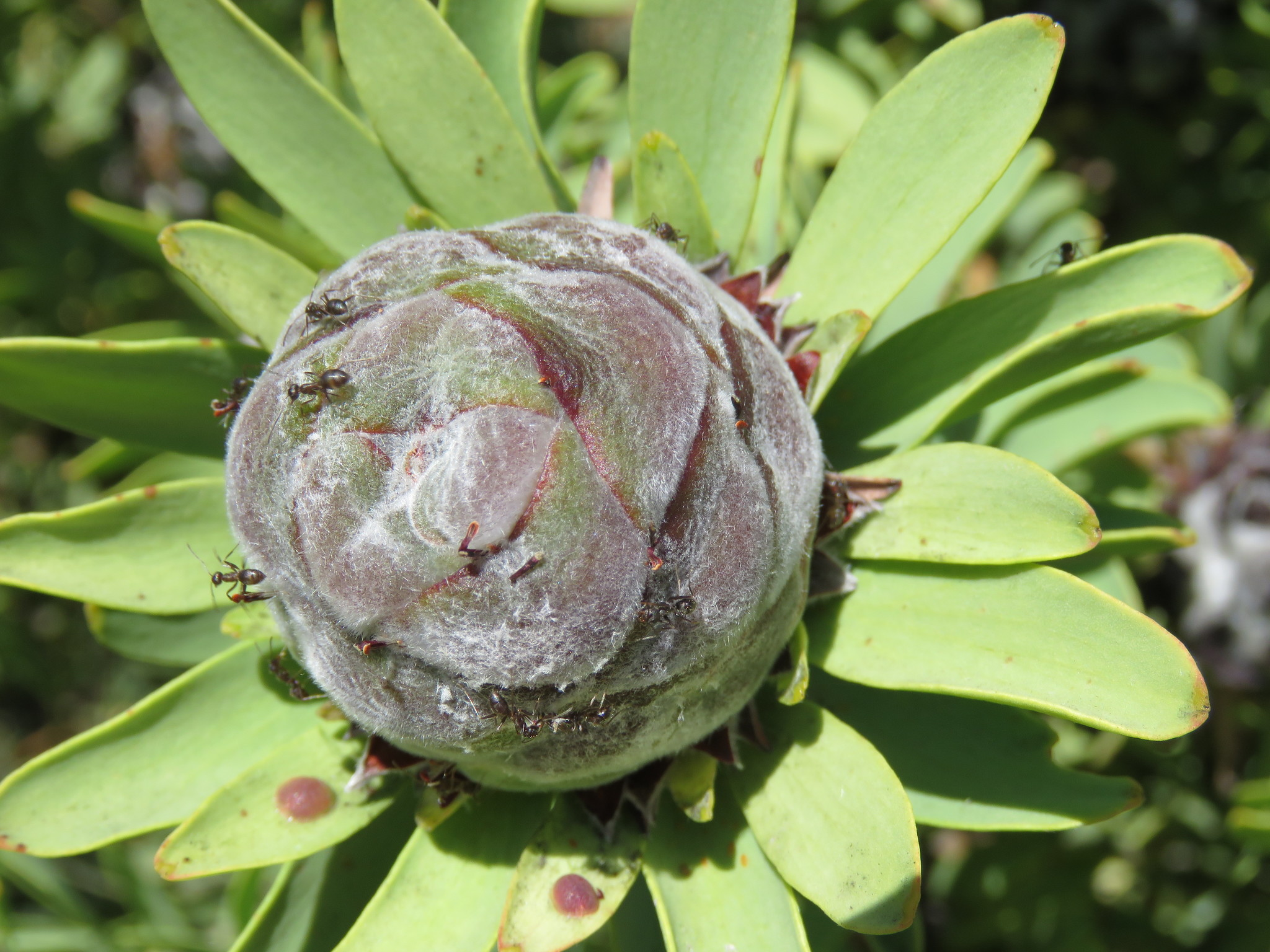

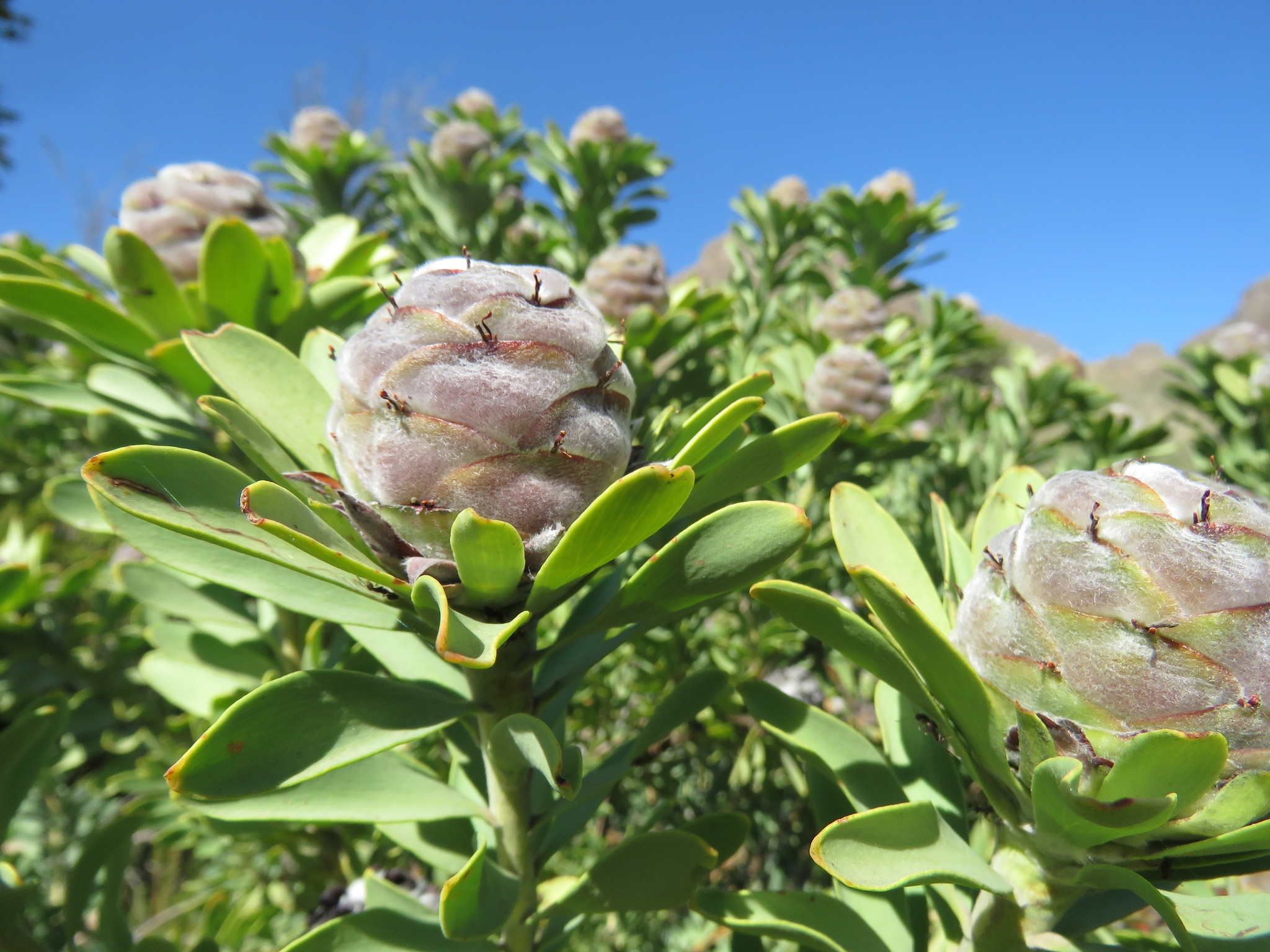

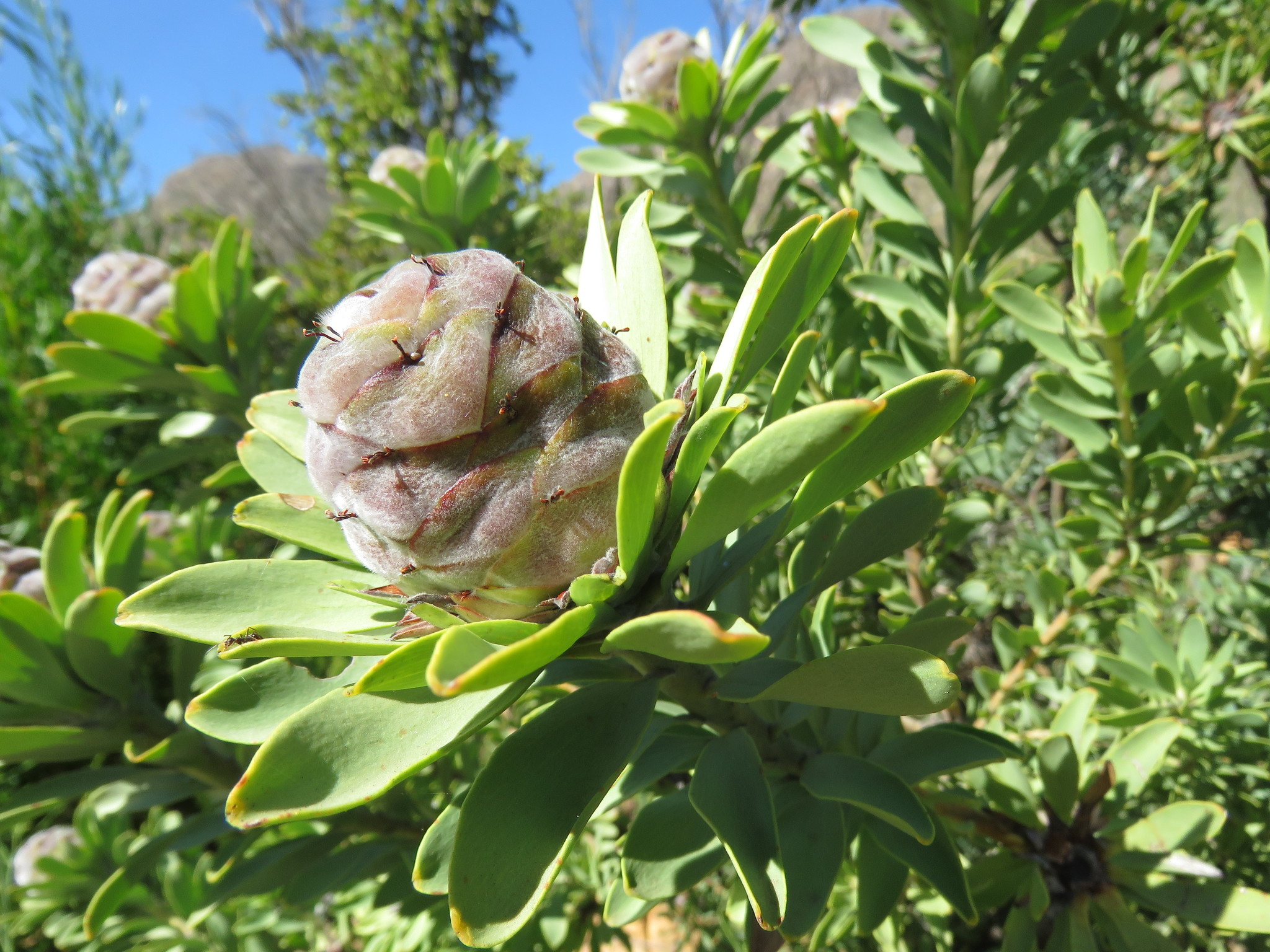

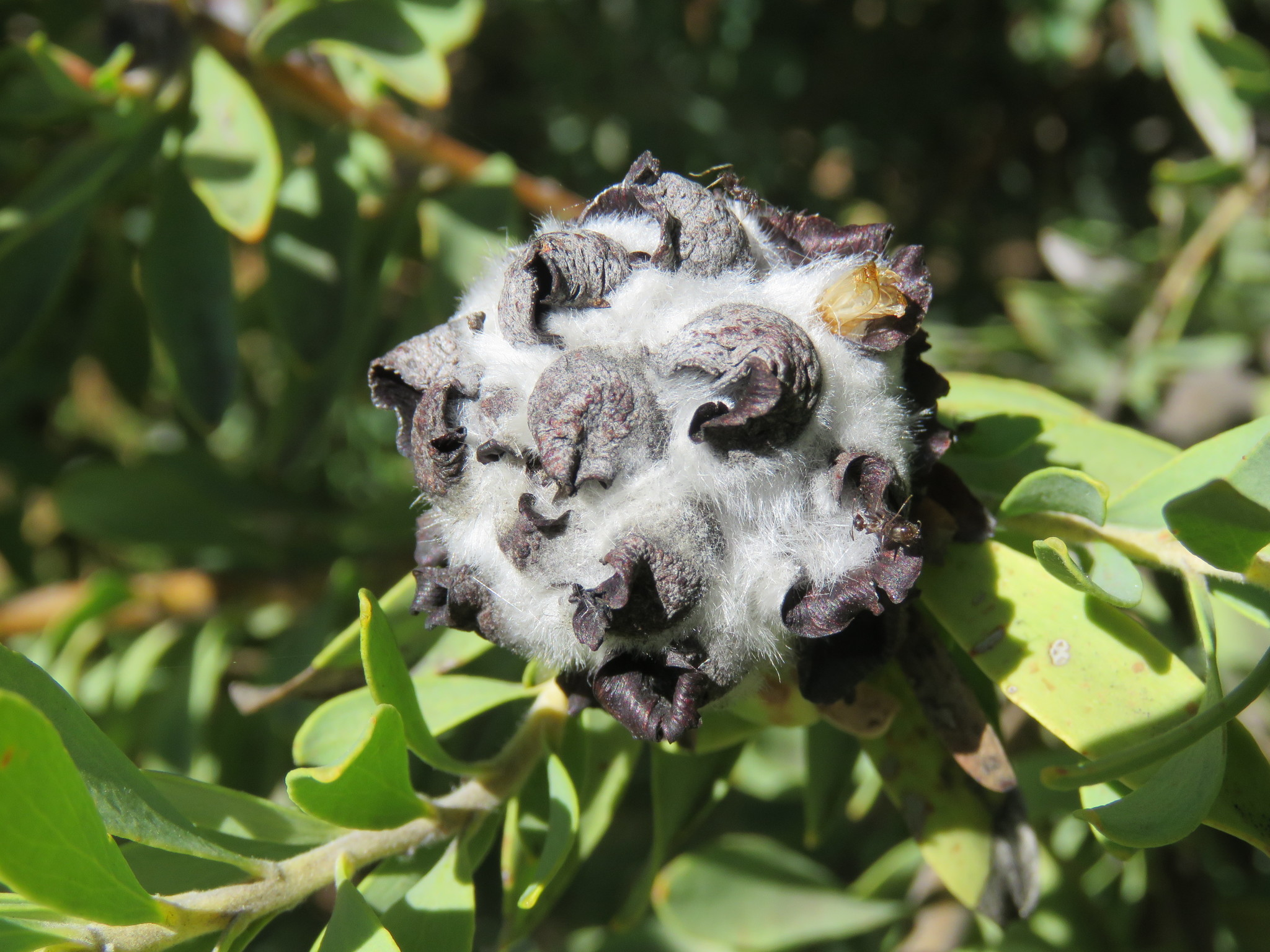

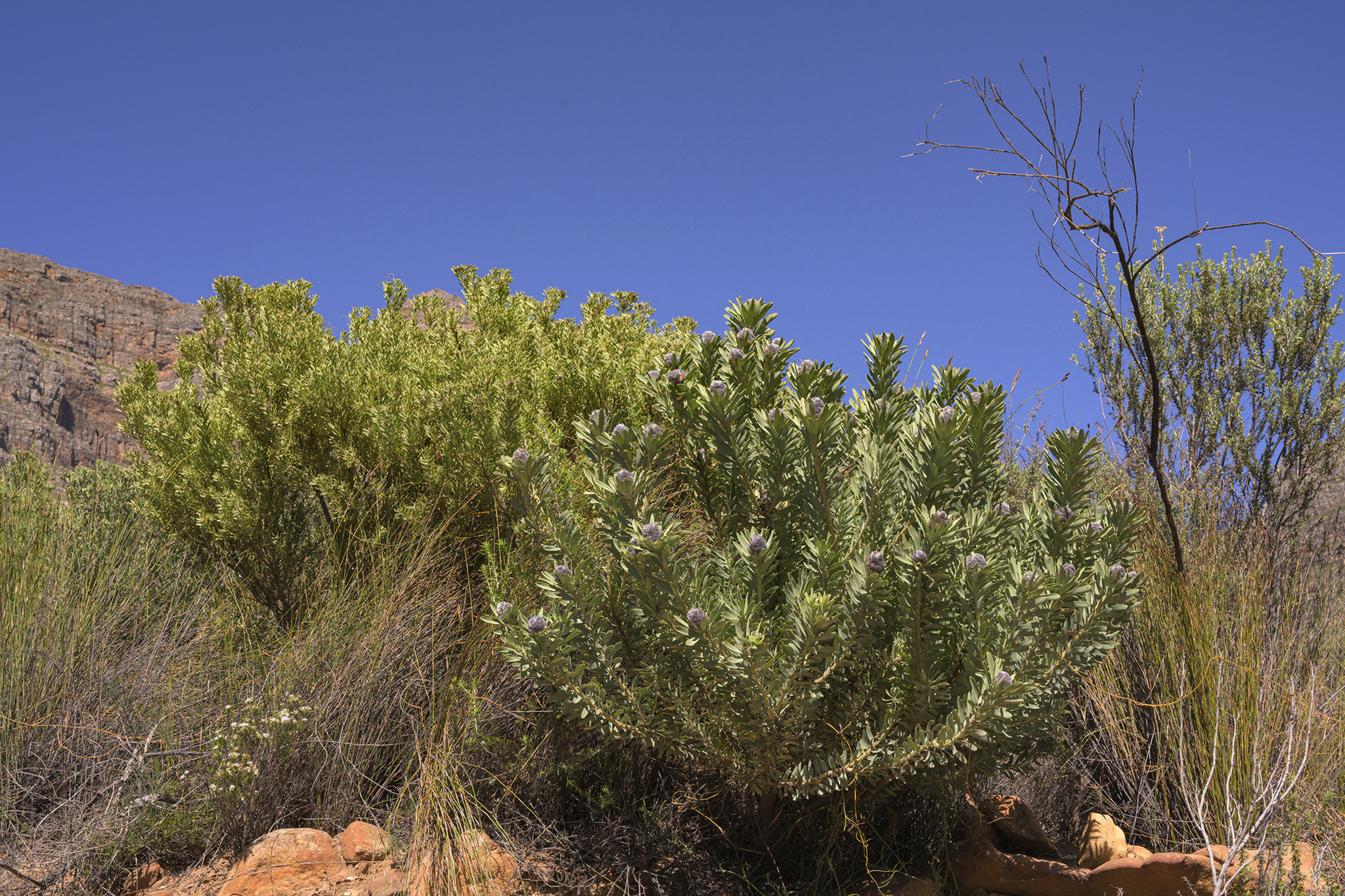
