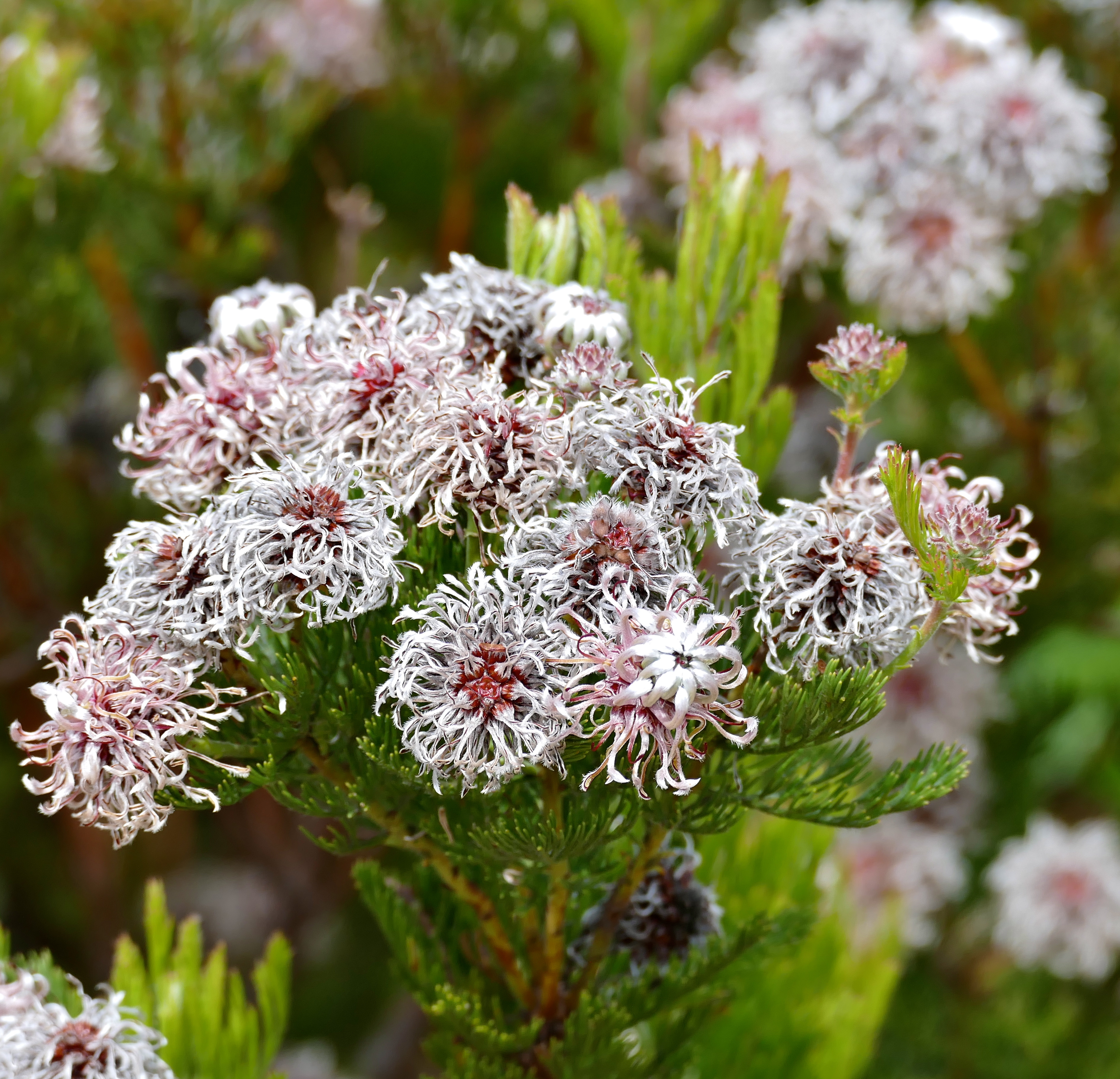

Conservation status
- Near Threatened (IUCN 3.1)

Scientific classification
- Kingdom: Plantae
- Clade: Tracheophytes
- Clade: Angiosperms
- Clade: Eudicots
- Order: Proteales
- Family: Proteaceae
- Genus: Serruria
- Species: S. fucifolia

Binomial name
- Serruria fucifolia Salisb. ex Knight

= Serruria fucifolia =

Species of plant

Serruria fucifolia, the northern spiderhead, is a flower-bearing shrub that belongs to the genus Serruria and forms part of the fynbos. The plant is native to the Western Cape, South Africa.

== Description ==
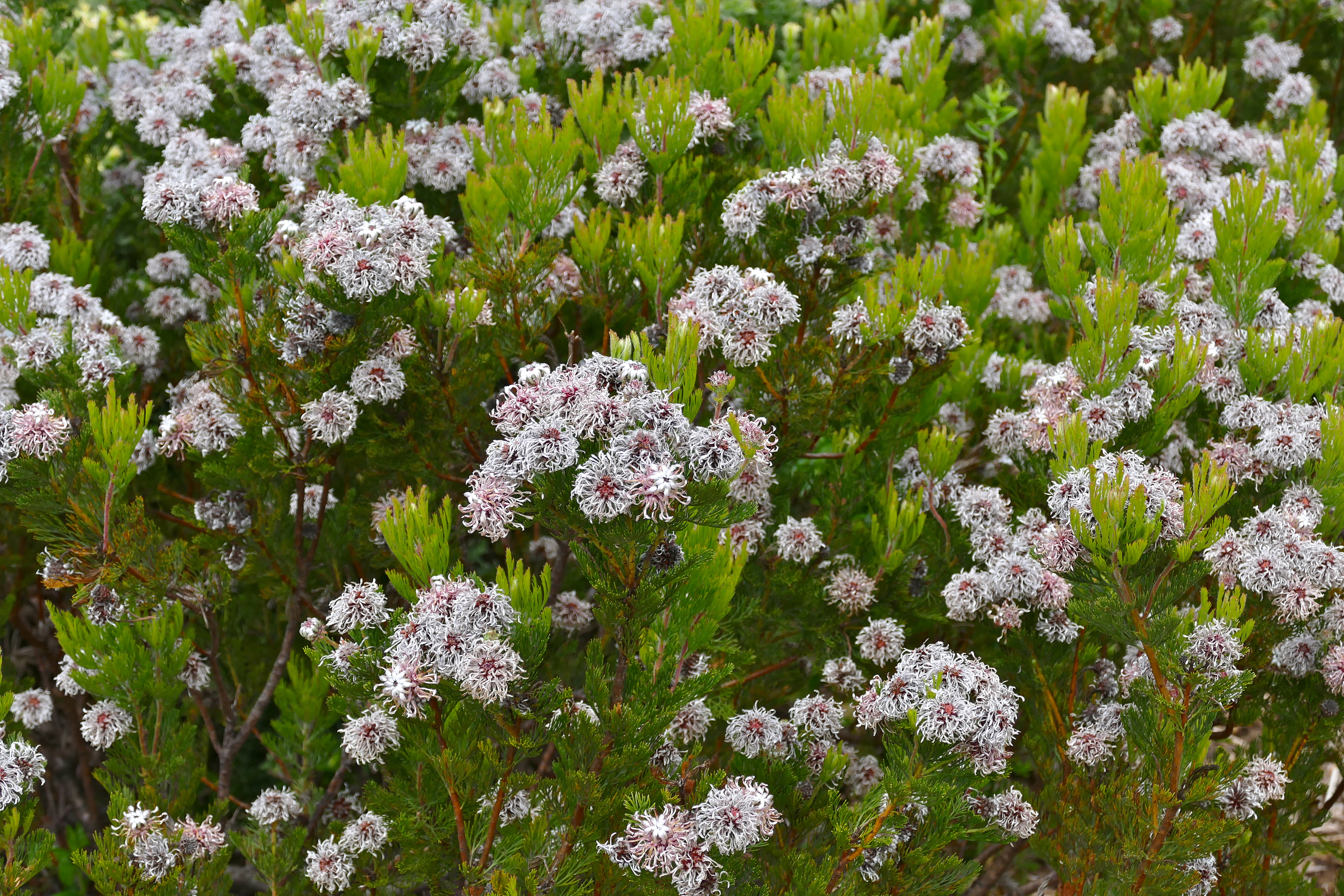

The shrub is erect and round and grows only 1.5 m (4.9 ft) tall. It bears silver-pink flowers from July to October. Fires in the summer destroy the plant but the seeds survive. Two months after flowering, the fruit falls off and ants disperse the seeds. They store the seeds in their nests. The plant is bisexual. It is pollinated by insects.

In Afrikaans, it is known as sandveldspinnekopbos.

== Distribution and habitat ==
The plant occurs in the Sandveld to the Hopefield Plains, Gifberg to the Olifants River Mountains and Piketberg. It grows in sandstone and sandy soils at altitudes of 150–920 m (490–3,020 ft).
