= Venkata Rao =

Venkata Rao or Venkatarao is the name of several people from India:

- Venkata Rao III (1892–1927), Indian ruler of the princely state of Sandur
- Aluru Venkata Rao (1880–1964), Indian leader in the Karnataka Ekikarana movement
- Venkatrao K. Badami (1888–1950), Indian agronomist and plant breeder
- Chellapilla Venkata Rao (1910–1971), Indian botanist
- Kala Venkata Rao (1900–1959), Indian freedom fighter and politician in Andhra Pradesh
- Kavikondala Venkata Rao (1892–1969), Indian writer in the Telugu language from Andhra Pradesh
- R. Venkata Rao (died 1843), Indian administrator and statesman who served as Diwan of Travancore 1821–29 and 1838–39
- Venkatarao Tarodekar, Indian politician
- Yadlapati Venkatarao (1919–2022), ex-minister, former Rajyasabha MP and politician in Andhra Pradesh
- Venkata Ranga Rao (1862–1921), Indian landlord and zamindar
- Reddy Row, also known as Venkata Row, Diwan of Travancore 1817–21 and 1843–45

== See also ==
- Venkatrao, alternative form of the given name
- Venkatraopalle, a town in Telangana, India
- Venkatraopally(B), a village in Telangana, India
- Venkatraopet, a village in Telangana, India
- Venkatraopet, Eluru, Andhra Pradesh, India
