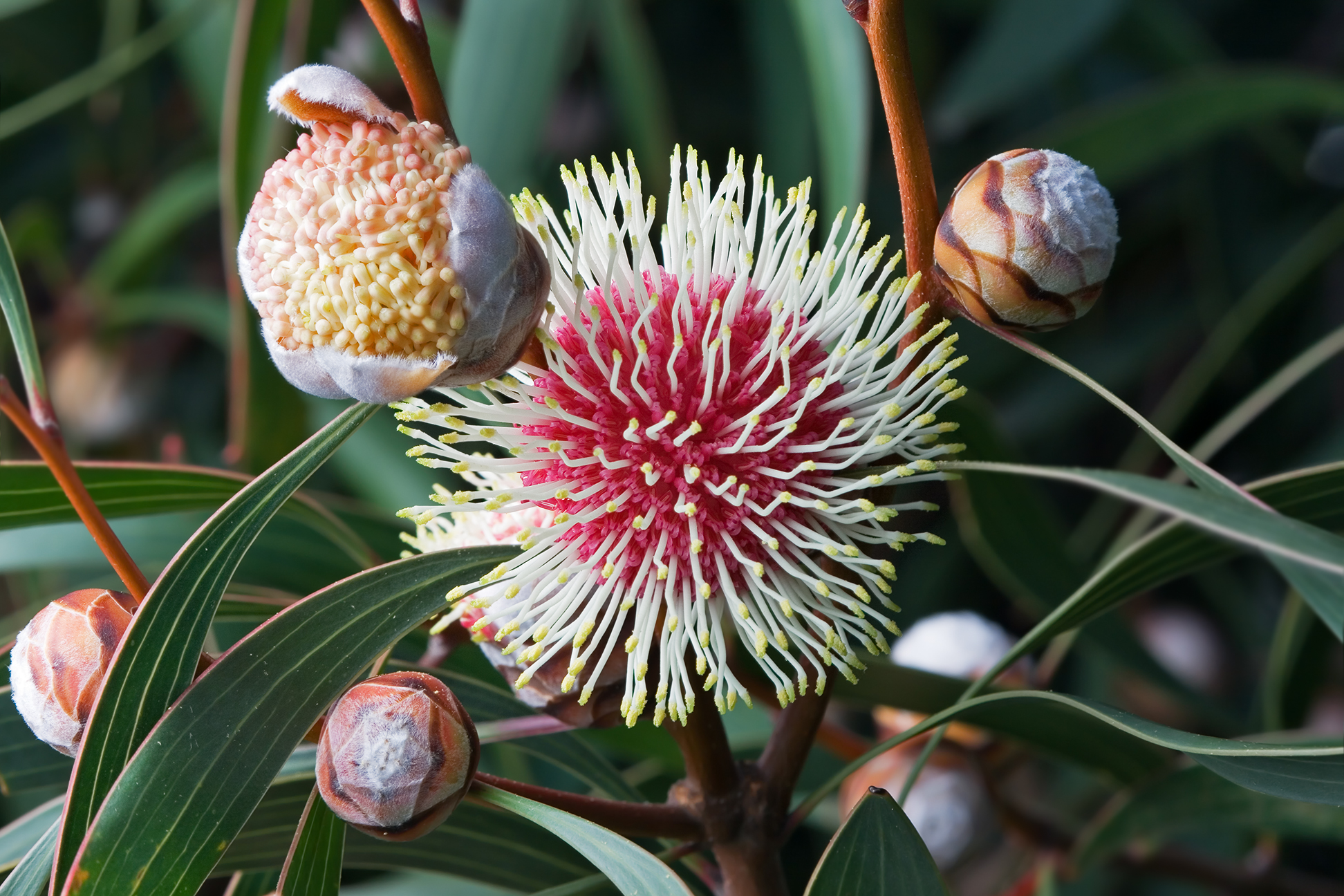
- Inflorescence and leaves of the pin-cushion hakea (Hakea laurina)

Scientific classification
- Kingdom: Plantae
- Clade: Tracheophytes
- Clade: Angiosperms
- Clade: Eudicots
- Order: Proteales
- Family: Proteaceae
- Subfamily: Grevilleoideae; Engl.

Genera
- See text

= Grevilleoideae =

Subfamily of plants, mainly from the Southern Hemisphere

The Grevilleoideae are a subfamily of the plant family Proteaceae. Mainly restricted to the Southern Hemisphere, it contains around 46 genera and about 950 species. Genera include Banksia, Grevillea, and Macadamia.

== Description ==
The Grevilleoideae grow as trees, shrubs, or subshrubs. They are highly variable, making a simple, diagnostic identification key for the subfamily essentially impossible to provide. One common and fairly diagnostic characteristic is the occurrence of flowers in pairs that share a common bract. However, a few Grevilleoideae taxa do not have this property, having solitary flowers or inflorescences of unpaired flowers. In most taxa, the flowers occur in densely packed heads or spikes, and the fruit is a follicle.

== Distribution and habitat ==
Grevilleoideae are mainly a Southern Hemisphere family. The main centre of diversity is Australia, with around 700 of 950 species occurring there, and South America also contains taxa. However, the Grevilleoideae are barely present in Africa, where almost all of Proteaceae taxa belong to the subfamily Proteoideae. The lone exception and only grevilleoid in Africa is the Brabejum tree of Cape Town.

== Taxonomy ==
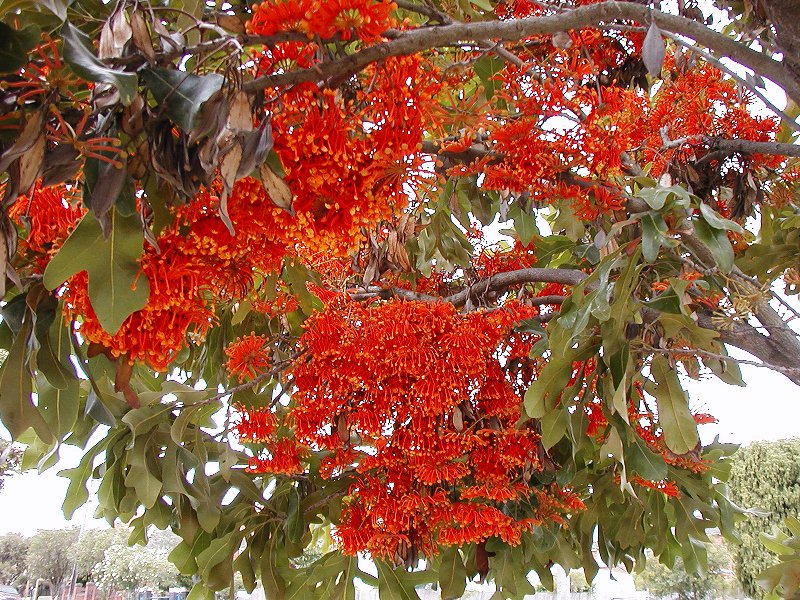
Stenocarpus sinuatus (firewheel tree)

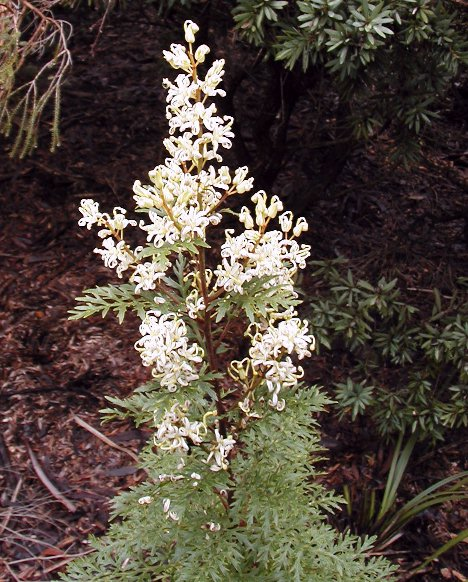
Lomatia silaifolia

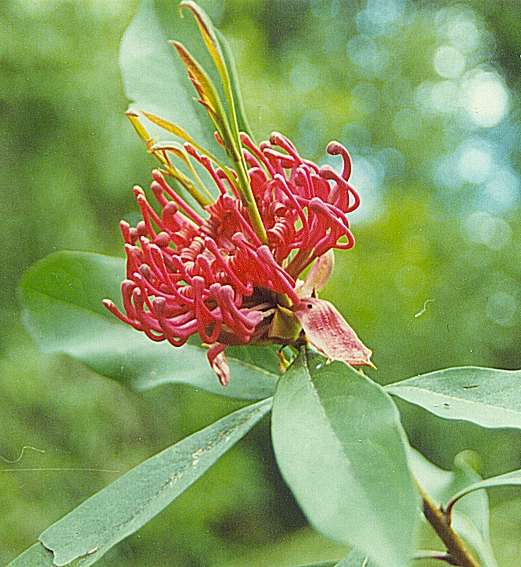
Telopea oreades, the Gippsland waratah

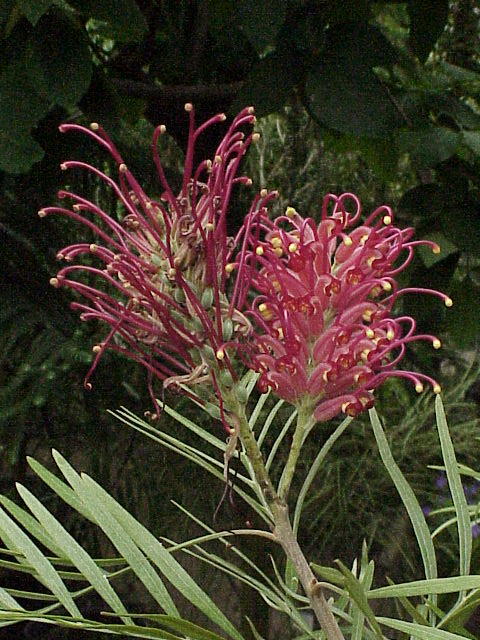
Grevillea banksii

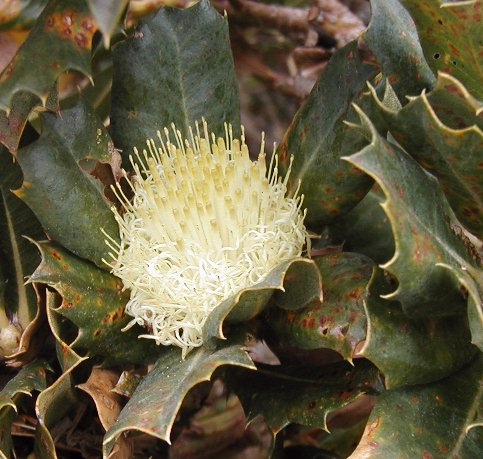
Banksia sessilis (parrotbush)

The framework for classification of the Proteaceae was laid by L.A.S. Johnson and Barbara Briggs in their 1975 monograph "On the Proteaceae: the evolution and classification of a southern family". Their classification has been refined somewhat over the ensuing three decades, most notably by Peter H. Weston and Nigel Barker in 2006. The Grevilleoideae are now considered one of five subfamilies of the Proteaceae. The placement and circumscription of the Grevilleoideae in four tribes, according to Weston and Barker can be summarised as:

- Tribe incertae sedis

Sphalmium — Carnarvonia

=== Roupaleae ===
Authority: Meisn.

incertae sedis

Megahertzia — Knightia — Eucarpha — Triunia

Subtribe Roupalinae L.A.S.Johnson & B.G.Briggs

Roupala — Neorites — Orites

Subtribe Lambertiinae (Venk.Rao) L.A.S.Johnson & B.G.Briggs

Lambertia — Xylomelum

Subtribe Heliciinae L.A.S.Johnson & B.G.Briggs

Helicia — Hollandaea

Subtribe Floydiinae L.A.S.Johnson & B.G.Briggs

Darlingia — Floydia

=== Banksieae ===
Authority: Rchb.

fossil form genera

Banksieaeidites — Banksieaeformis — Banksieaephyllum

Subtribe Musgraveinae L.A.S.Johnson & B.G.Briggs

Musgravea — Austromuellera

Subtribe Banksiinae L.A.S.Johnson & B.G.Briggs

Banksia

=== Embothrieae ===
Authority: Rchb.

Subtribe Lomatiinae L.A.S.Johnson & B.G.Briggs

Lomatia

Subtribe Embothriinae Endl.

Embothrium — Oreocallis — Alloxylon — Telopea

Subtribe Stenocarpinae L.A.S.Johnson & B.G.Briggs

Stenocarpus — Strangea

Subtribe Hakeinae Endl.

Opisthiolepis — Buckinghamia — Hakea — Grevillea — Finschia

=== Macadamieae ===
Authority: Venk.Rao

Subtribe Macadamiinae L.A.S.Johnson & B.G.Briggs

Macadamia — Panopsis — Brabejum

Subtribe Malagasiinae P.H.Weston & N.P.Barker

Malagasia — Catalepidia

Subtribe Virotiinae P.H.Weston & N.P.Barker

Virotia — Athertonia — Heliciopsis

Subtribe Gevuininae L.A.S.Johnson & B.G.Briggs

Cardwellia — Euplassa — Gevuina — Bleasdalea — Hicksbeachia — Kermadecia

== Uses ==
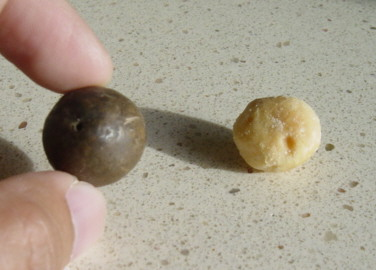
Edible nuts of Macadamia

The nursery industry cultivates many Grevilleoideae species as barrier plants and for their prominent and distinctive flowers and foliage. Some species are of importance to the cut-flower industry, especially some Banksia and Dryandra species. Two species of the genus Macadamia and the Chilean species Gevuina avellana (Chilean hazel) are grown commercially for edible nuts. Chilean hazel has an acceptable frost tolerance.
