= Malagasia =

Conservation status
- Endangered (IUCN 3.1)

Scientific classification
- Kingdom: Plantae
- Clade: Embryophytes
- Clade: Tracheophytes
- Clade: Angiosperms
- Clade: Eudicots
- Order: Proteales
- Family: Proteaceae
- Subfamily: Grevilleoideae
- Tribe: Macadamieae
- Subtribe: Malagasiinae
- Genus: Malagasia; L.A.S.Johnson & B.G.Briggs
- Species: M. alticola

Binomial name
- Malagasia alticola (Capuron) L.A.S.Johnson & B.G.Briggs

Synonyms
- Macadamia alticola Capuron

Monotypic genus of trees endemic to Madagascar

Malagasia is a monotypic genus of trees in the family Proteaceae. The sole species is Malagasia alticola, endemic to Madagascar.

The species was originally described in 1963 by French botanist René Capuron. Capuron included the new species in the genus Macadamia, naming it Macadamia alticola. The species was transferred to the newly erected genus Malagasia in 1975 by Barbara Briggs and Lawrie Johnson.
