= Sphalmium =

Scientific classification
- Kingdom: Plantae
- Clade: Tracheophytes
- Clade: Angiosperms
- Clade: Eudicots
- Order: Proteales
- Family: Proteaceae
- Subfamily: Grevilleoideae
- Genus: Sphalmium (C.T.White) B.G.Briggs, B.Hyland & L.A.S.Johnson
- Species: S. racemosum

Binomial name
- Sphalmium racemosum (C.T.White) B.G.Briggs, B.Hyland & L.A.S.Johnson

Synonyms
- Orites racemosa C.T.White

Monotypic genus of flowering plants in the protea family

Sphalmium is a monotypic genus of flowering plants in the protea family. The only species, Sphalmium racemosum, is a large forest tree. Common names include satin silky oak, mystery oak, Mt Lewis oak, poorman's fishtail oak and buff silky oak.

The tree grows to 30 m (100 ft) or more. It is endemic to the upland rainforests of the wet tropics region of northeastern Queensland, Australia.

== History ==
Botanists Barbara Briggs, Bernie Hyland and Lawrie Johnson named the new genus, updated the description and named the new species combination in 1975. They based the new species combination name on Cyril T. White's 1939 description of Orites racemosa, now a synonym.
