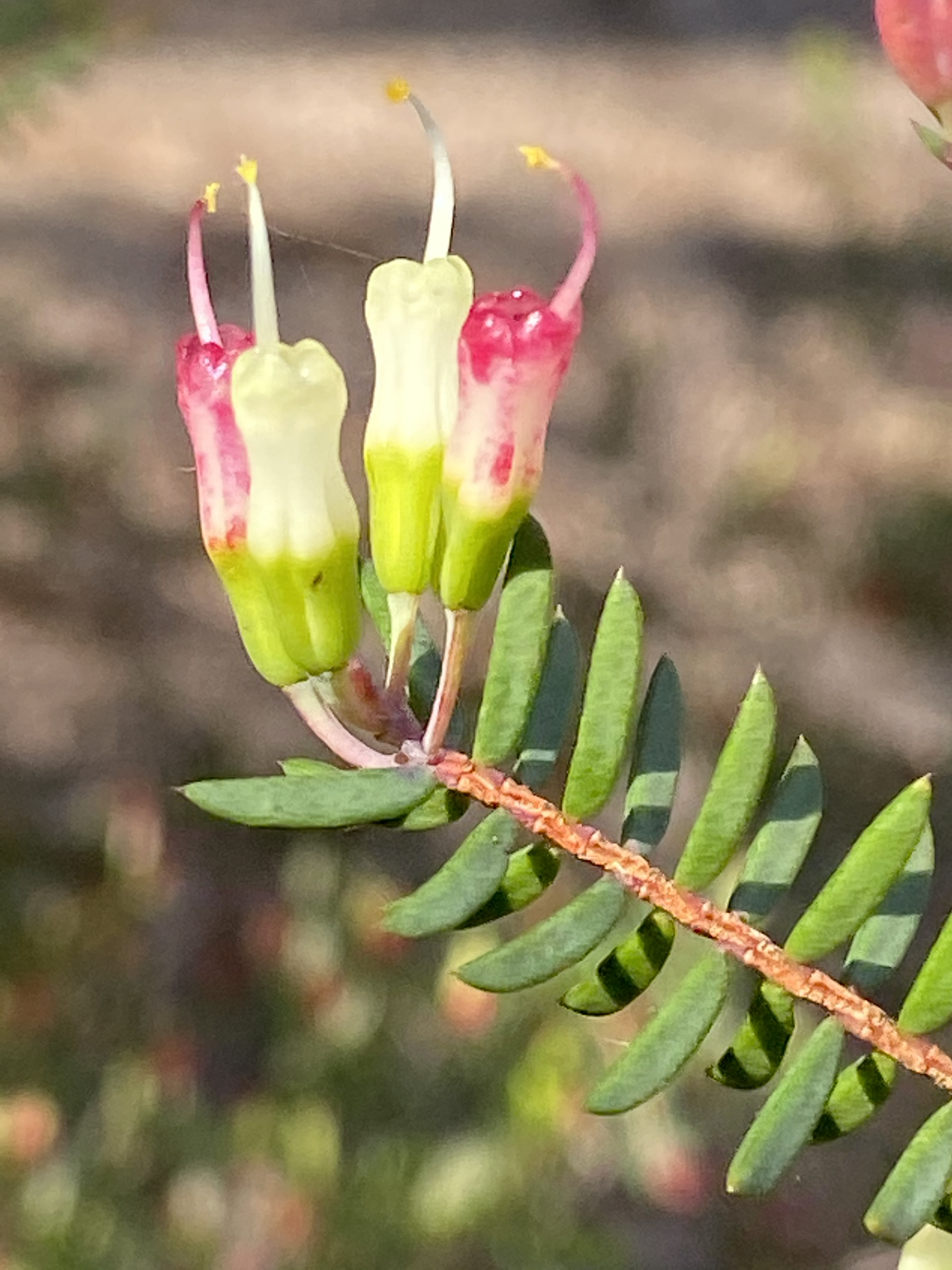

Scientific classification
- Kingdom: Plantae
- Clade: Tracheophytes
- Clade: Angiosperms
- Clade: Eudicots
- Clade: Rosids
- Order: Myrtales
- Family: Myrtaceae
- Genus: Darwinia
- Species: D. peduncularis

Binomial name
- Darwinia peduncularis B.G.Briggs
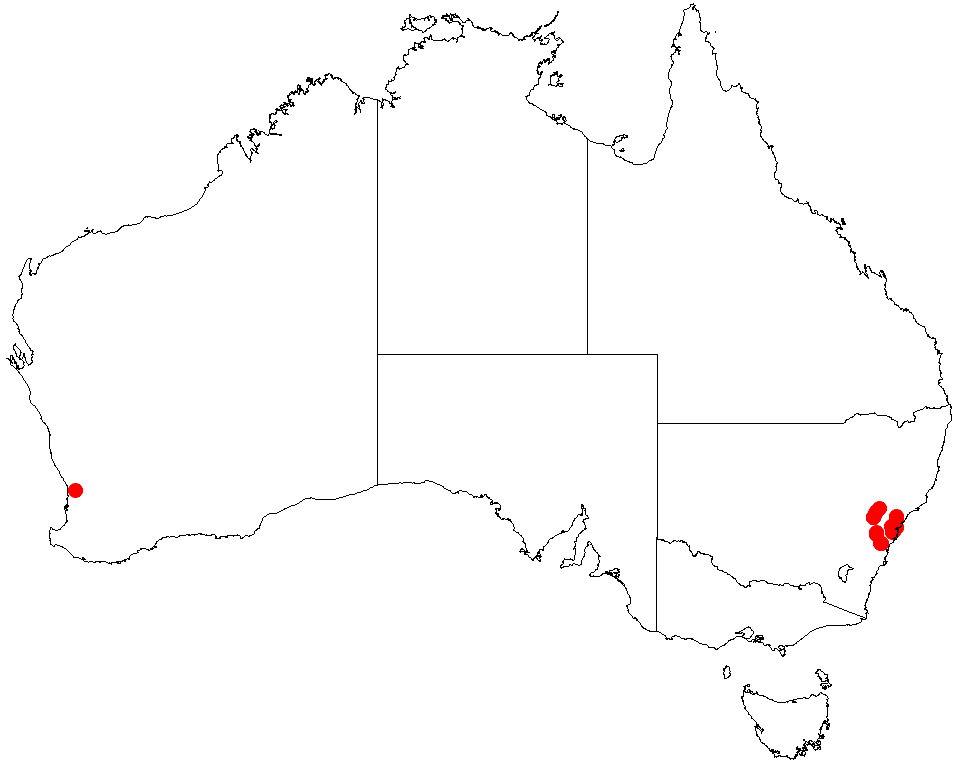
- Occurrence data from AVH

= Darwinia peduncularis =

Species of flowering plant

Darwinia peduncularis is a species of flowering plant in the myrtle family Myrtaceae and is endemic to the Sydney region in New South Wales. It is a shrub with flattened leaves and purplish red flowers usually arranged in pairs.

== Description ==
Darwinia peduncluaris is a broadly-spreading shrub that typically growing to a height of 1.5 m (4 ft 11 in) and has glabrous, flattened, spreading leaves 7–12 mm (0.28–0.47 in) long. Flowering occurs from late winter to early spring and the flowers usually occur in pairs on a peduncle 4–7 mm (0.16–0.28 in) long and often curved downwards. There are leaf-like, triangular bracts 1–10 mm (0.039–0.394 in) long and oblong bracteoles 4–8 mm (0.16–0.31 in) long at the base of the flowers but that fall off as the flower develops.

== Taxonomy ==
Darwinia peduncularis was first formally described in 1962 by Barbara G. Briggs in Contributions from the New South Wales National Herbarium from specimens she collected near Hornsby in 1958.

== Distribution and habitat ==
This darwinia grows on sandstone hillsides and ridges in dry sclerophyll forest between Hornsby, the Hawkesbury River and inland as far as Glen Davis.

== Conservation status ==
Darwinia peduncularis is listed as "vulnerable" under the New South Wales Government Biodiversity Conservation Act 2016.
