= Chellapilla =

Chellapilla is a Telugu surname. Belonging to the Aaraama Dravidulu subcaste of Telugu Brahmins. They are traditionally categorized as the Saiva Brahmins or followers of Shiva.

Dravida Brahmins are believed to have migrated from Saurashtra to Southern India around the 13th century, settling first along the Kaveri River in Tamil Nadu and later in Andhra Pradesh. Over time, they assimilated into Telugu society, forming unique subgroups like the Aaraamadravidas, who initially settled in garden areas and established distinct cultural identities.

- Chellapilla Satyam, Indian film music director
- Chellapilla Venkata Sastry, a prominent member of the Chellapilla lineage and part of the poet duo Tirupati Venkata Kavulu, is recognized for blending Sanskrit and Telugu literary traditions. His works, influenced by the Aaraamadravida tradition, adapted classical Sanskrit themes into accessible Telugu verse.
- Chellapilla Venkata Rao, Indian botanist (1910–1971) known for his Scientific career in Proteaceae, Plant Embryology, and Plant anatomy.
