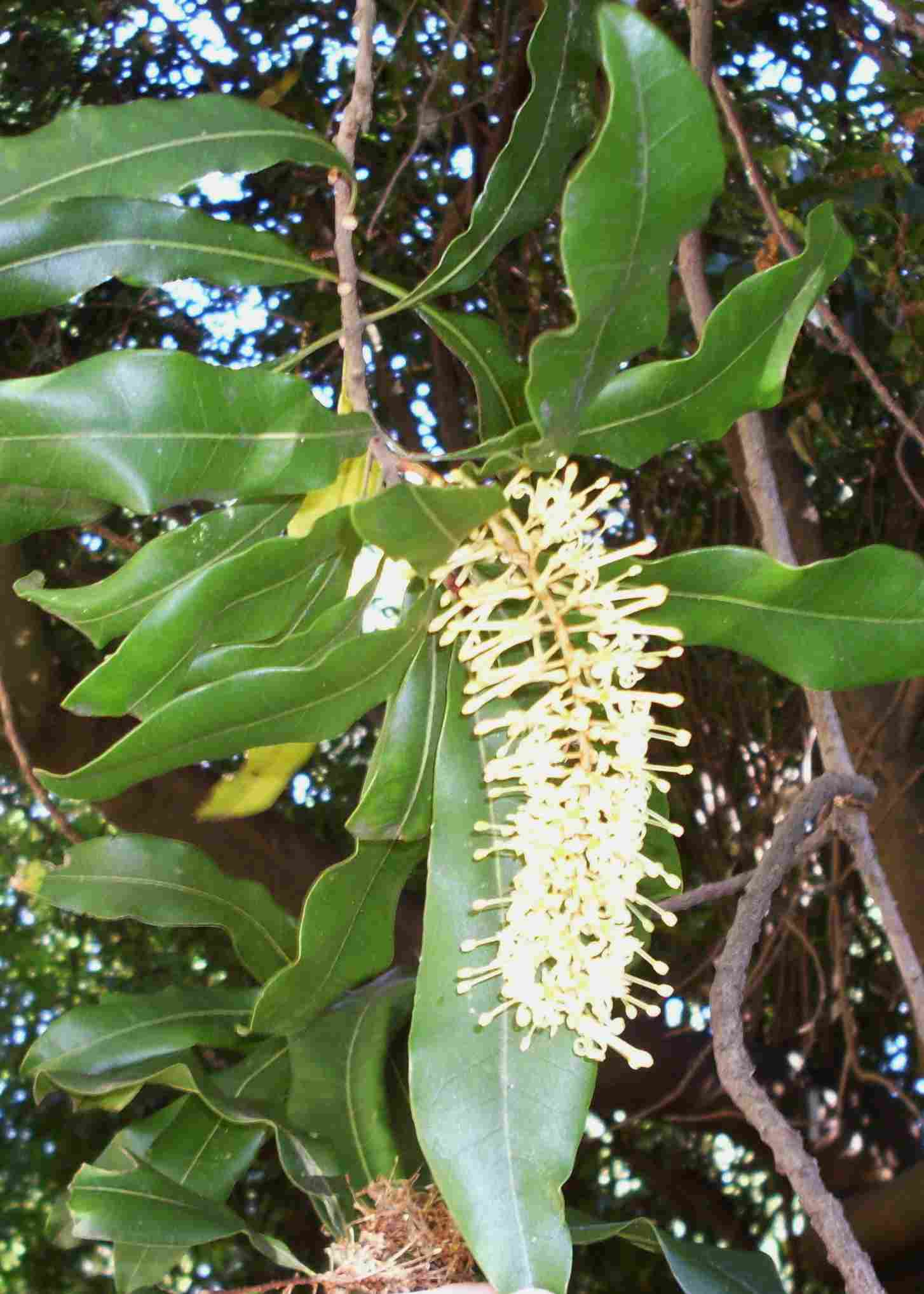
- Flower & leaves

Conservation status
- Vulnerable (EPBC Act)
- Vulnerable (NCA)

Scientific classification
- Kingdom: Plantae
- Clade: Tracheophytes
- Clade: Angiosperms
- Clade: Eudicots
- Order: Proteales
- Family: Proteaceae
- Subfamily: Grevilleoideae
- Tribe: Roupaleae
- Subtribe: Floydiinae
- Genus: Floydia; L.A.S.Johnson & B.G.Briggs
- Species: F. praealta

Binomial name
- Floydia praealta (F.Muell.) L.A.S.Johnson & B.G.Briggs

= Floydia =

Genus of plants endemic to Australia

Floydia is a monotypic genus of plants in the Proteaceae family endemic to Australia. The sole described species is Floydia praealta, commonly known as the ball nut. It is a somewhat rare tree found only growing in the rainforests of southeastern Queensland and northeastern New South Wales. The tree has a superficial resemblance to the closely related Macadamia and could be confused with them. The fruit is poisonous.

== Description ==
Floydia praealta is a tree growing to 30 m (98 ft) tall with a trunk up to 60 cm (24 in) diameter. The leaves are mid-green, shiny, glabrous and stiff. They measure up to 25 cm (9.8 in) long by 3 cm (1.2 in) wide and are held on a petiole up to 1.2 cm (0.47 in) long. There are between 10 and 28 pairs of secondary veins and a densely reticulate tertiary venation which are all obvious on both surfaces.

The inflorescence is a raceme up to 20 cm (7.9 in) long carrying numerous cream flowers in pairs. The flowers have 4 hairy tepals and are up to 1.7 cm (0.67 in) long. The fruit is a globular, woody follicle around 3 or 4 cm (1.2 or 1.6 in) diameter.

== Taxonomy ==
The species was formally described in 1862 by Victorian Government Botanist Ferdinand von Mueller based on plant material collected near the Clarence River in northern New South Wales and the Brisbane River in Queensland. In his publication Fragmenta phytographiæ Australiæ Mueller named the plant Helicia praealta. The species was transferred to the genus Macadamia in 1901 by Queensland Colonial Botanist Frederick Manson Bailey and then to Floydia in 1975 by Lawrie Johnson and Barbara Briggs.

== Gallery ==
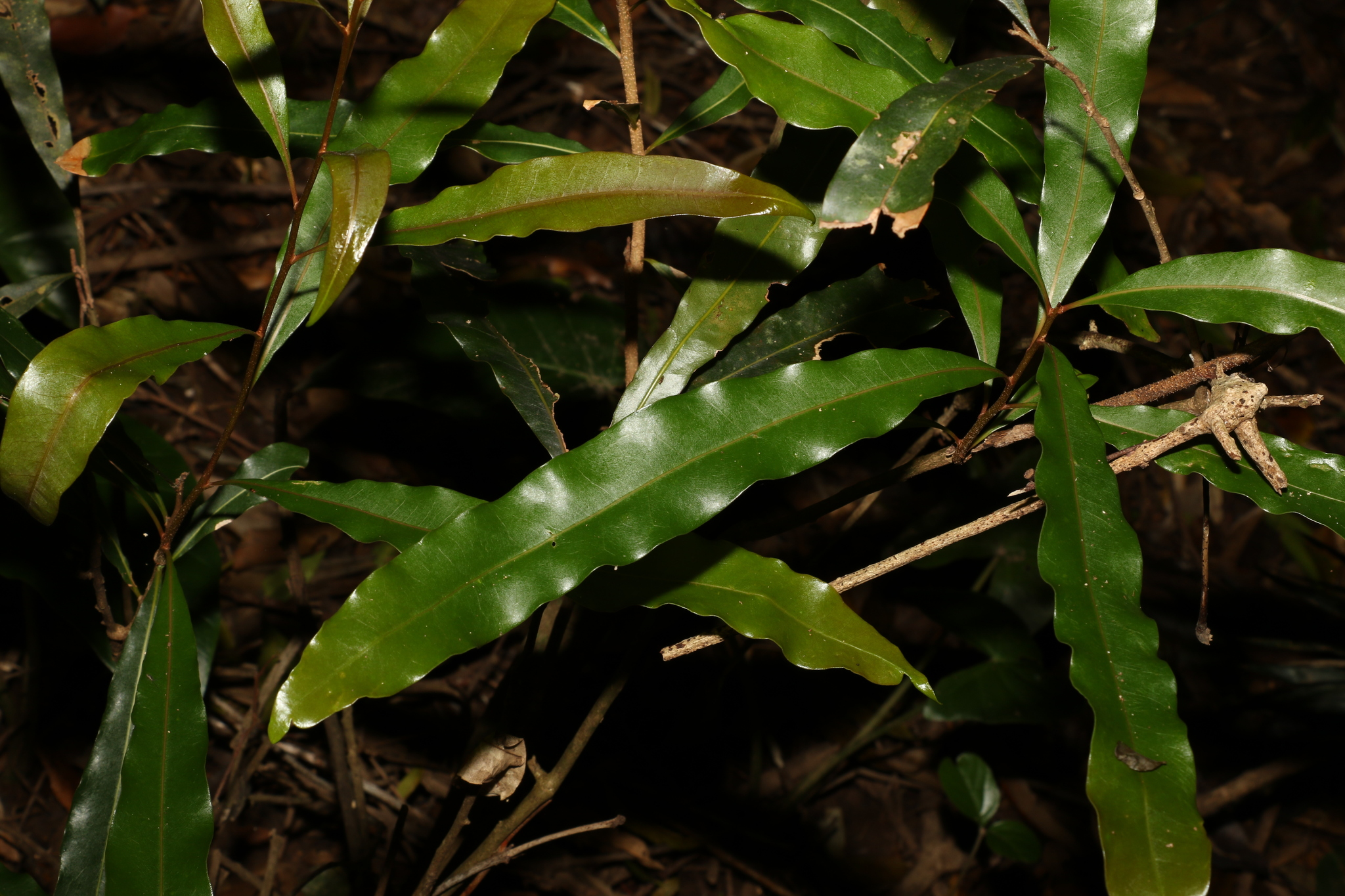
Foliage

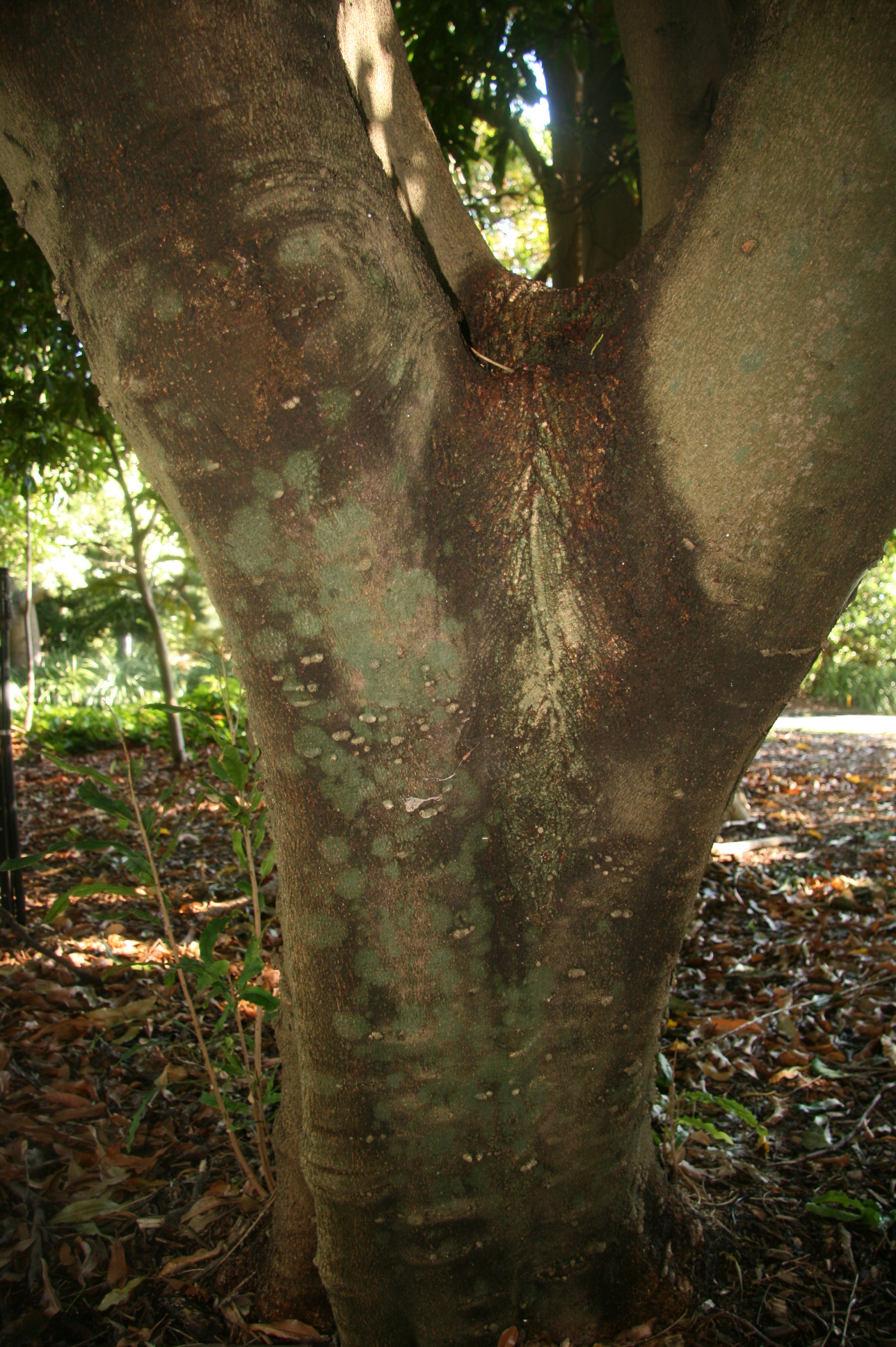
Trunk

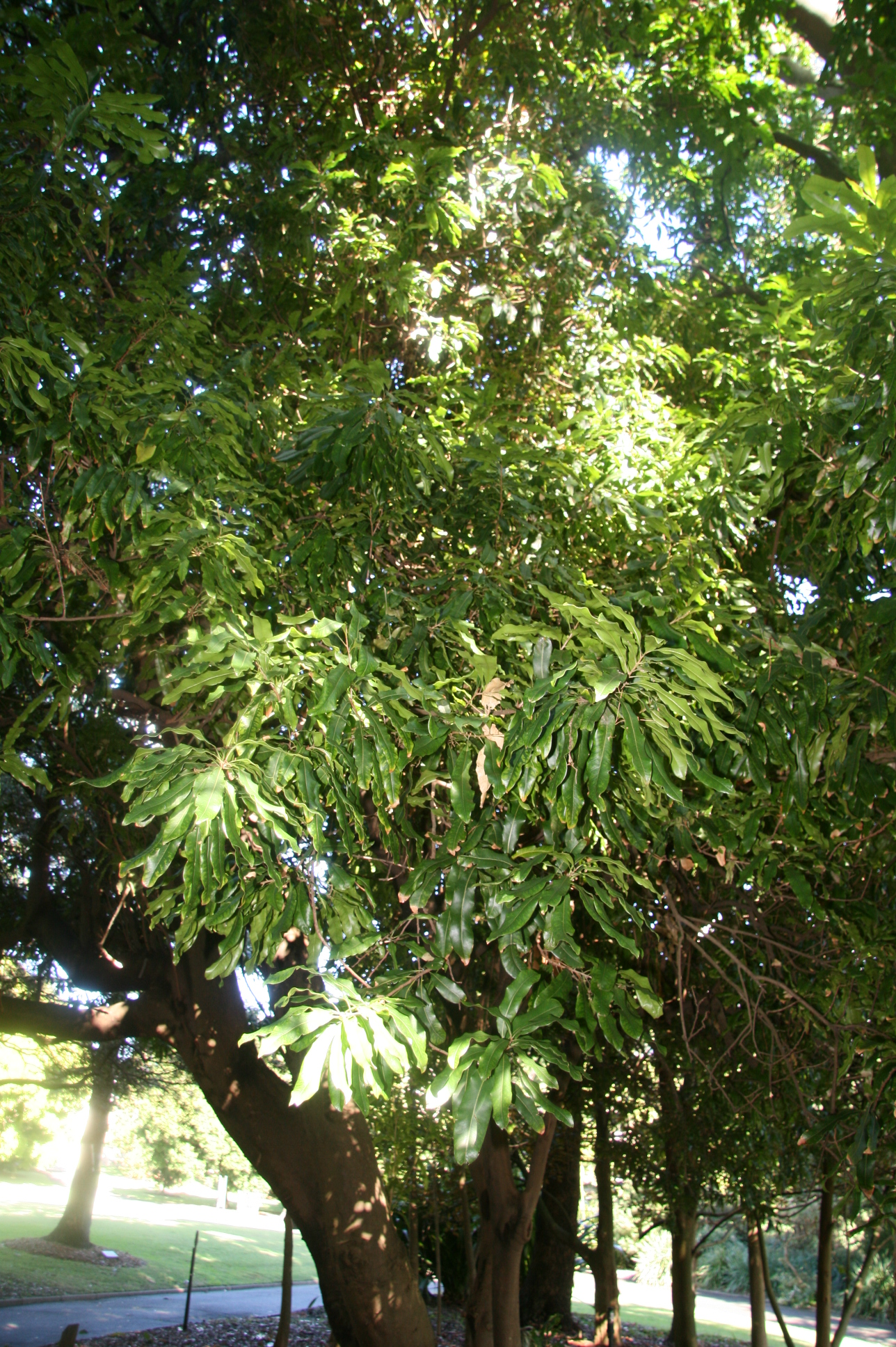
Foliage
