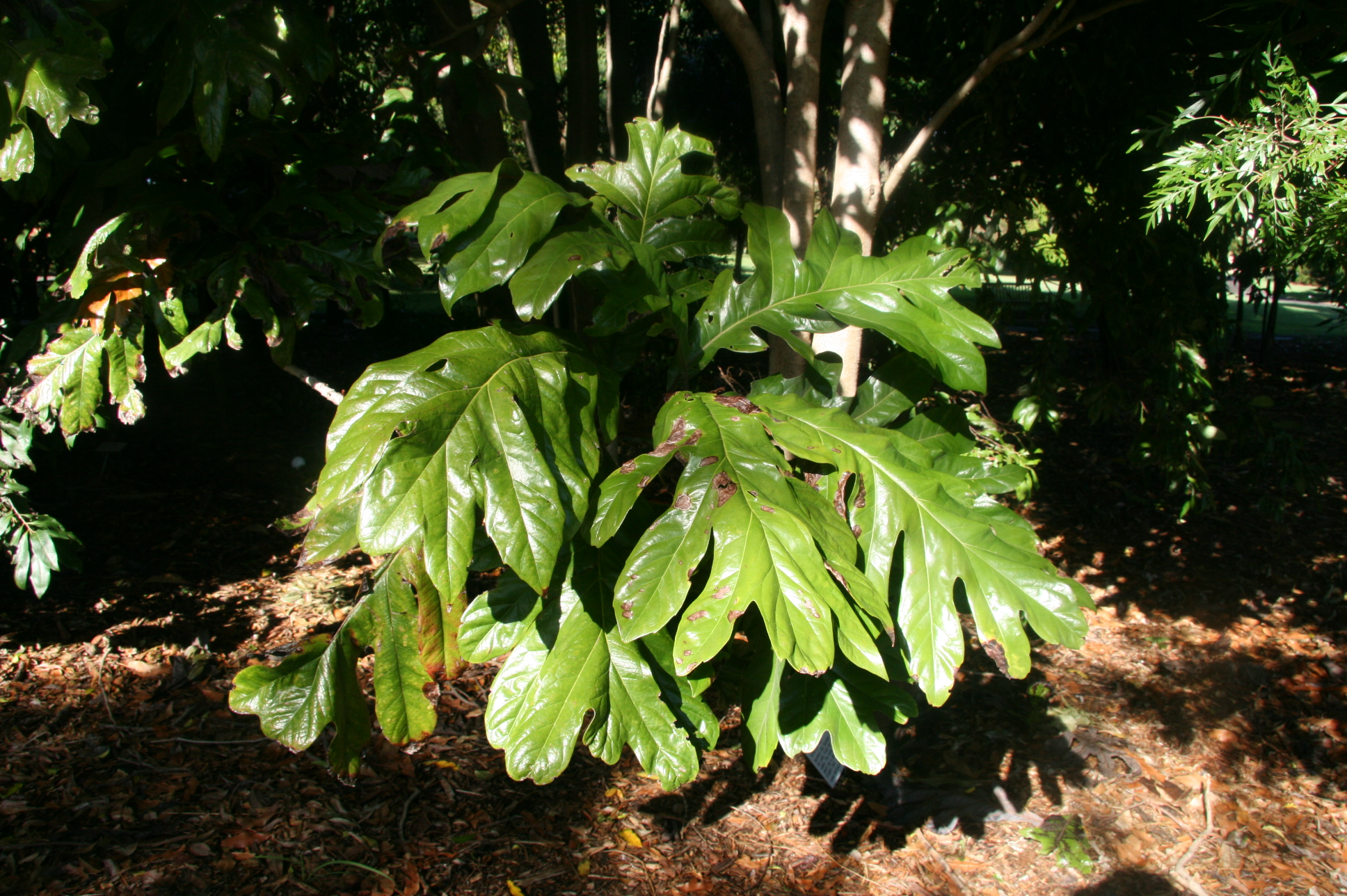

Conservation status
- Least Concern (NCA)
- Least Concern (IUCN 3.1)

Scientific classification
- Kingdom: Plantae
- Clade: Tracheophytes
- Clade: Angiosperms
- Clade: Eudicots
- Order: Proteales
- Family: Proteaceae
- Subfamily: Grevilleoideae
- Tribe: Macadamieae
- Subtribe: Virotiinae
- Genus: Athertonia; L.A.S.Johnson & B.G.Briggs
- Species: A. diversifolia

Binomial name
- Athertonia diversifolia (C.T.White) L.A.S.Johnson & B.G.Briggs

= Athertonia =

Monotypic genus of trees endemic to Australia

Athertonia is a monotypic genus of plants in the family Proteaceae. The sole described species is Athertonia diversifolia, commonly known as Atherton oak, athertonia, creamy silky oak or white oak. It is endemic to a small part of the Wet Tropics of Queensland, Australia. A relative of the macadamia, it has potential in horticulture and the bushfood industry.

== Description ==
Athertonia diversifolia is a tree growing up to 30 m (98 ft) tall, the trunk may be fluted and may be buttressed. New shoots and young branches are densely covered in fine rust-coloured hairs. The leaf morphology is highly variable − from a simple elliptic shape to deeply lobed, and they may be with or without finely toothed margins. The overall leaf size also varies considerably, from 7 by 4.5 cm (2.8 by 1.8 in) up to 27 by 13 cm (10.6 by 5.1 in). The petiole measures between 1–3 cm (0.4–1.2 in) long.

The inflorescence is a pendulous raceme up to 34 cm (13 in) long, produced terminally, in the leaf axils, and on the branches. The fragrant flowers are cream to green with 4 tepals, and measure up to 2.3 cm (0.91 in) long.

The fruit is green while developing − at maturity it is a blue (or occasionally rose coloured) lens-shaped drupe measuring around 4 cm (1.6 in) long, 3.5 cm (1.4 in) wide and 2.4 cm (0.94 in) thick. The hard, pitted endocarp contains a single seed.

=== Phenology ===
Flowering occurs from February to June, and fruit ripen around August to January.

== Taxonomy ==
Athertonia diversifolia was first described in 1918 as Helicia diversifolia by the Queensland Government botanist Cyril Tenison White in his paper Contribution to the Queensland Flora, published in the journal Botany Bulletin. Decades later, in 1955, the Dutch botanist Hermann Otto Sleumer placed it in the genus Hicksbeachia, where it stayed until 1975 when Lawrie Johnson and Barbara Briggs revised the description and created a new genus, Athertonia, for this plant.

=== Etymology ===
The genus name is a reference to the Atherton Tableland, where the type specimen was collected. The species epithet is derived from the Latin words diverto (to differ), and folia (leaf), and refers to the varied leaf morphology it displays.

=== Vernacular names ===
The common names "Atherton oak", "silky oak" and "white oak" are given to this species as a reference to the similarity of its leaves to those of the unrelated English oak (Quercus robur).

== Distribution and habitat ==
Athertonia diversifolia is found in north Queensland from the Cape Tribulation area south to the Atherton Tableland west of Mount Bartle Frere. It grows in rainforest, generally on deep soils of volcanic origin. The altitudinal range is mostly from around 700 to 1,150 m (2,300 to 3,770 ft), but confirmed observations have been made in lowland forest at just 10 m (33 ft) above sea level in the Cow Bay area.

== Ecology ==
The kernel contained within the hard endocarp of this species is edible to humans, and is also much sought after by native rats, which often gnaw through the hard shell and eat the kernel while it is still attached to the tree. The flowers attract a variety of nectar-eating birds.

== Conservation ==
Much of the original habitat of the Atherton oak has been cleared, and what is left is highly fragmented. Despite this the species has been given the classification of least concern, by both the Queensland Government Department of Environment and Science (DES), and the International Union for Conservation of Nature (IUCN). Whilst the DES does not publish its procedure or qualification details, the IUCN's assessment states that the population of this species is "locally common and stable", and that the "area, extent and/or quality" of its habitat is not declining.

== Uses ==
The Atherton oak has become widely cultivated, due to its attractive, glossy, lobed foliage, and its low maintenance.

== Gallery ==
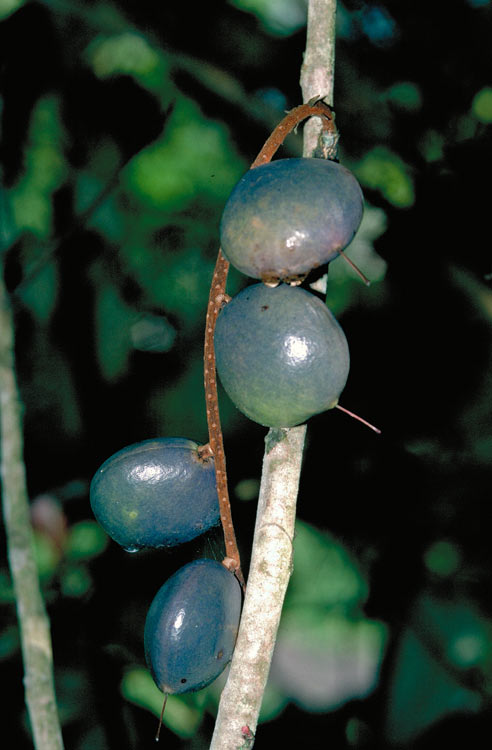
Ripe blue fruit

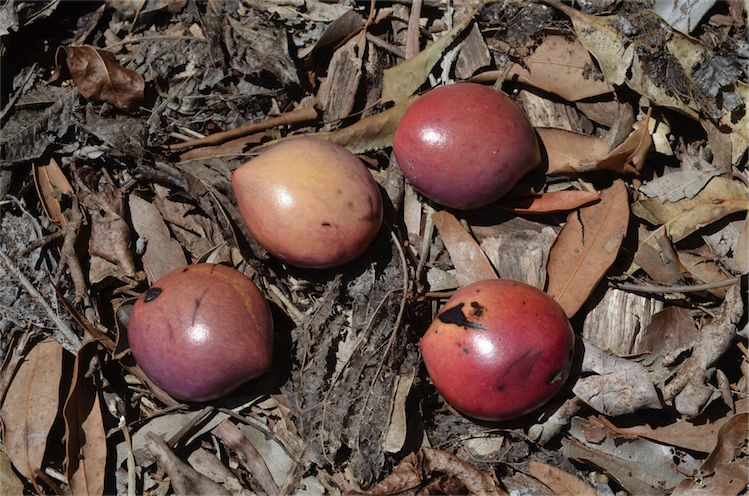
Rose-coloured fruit

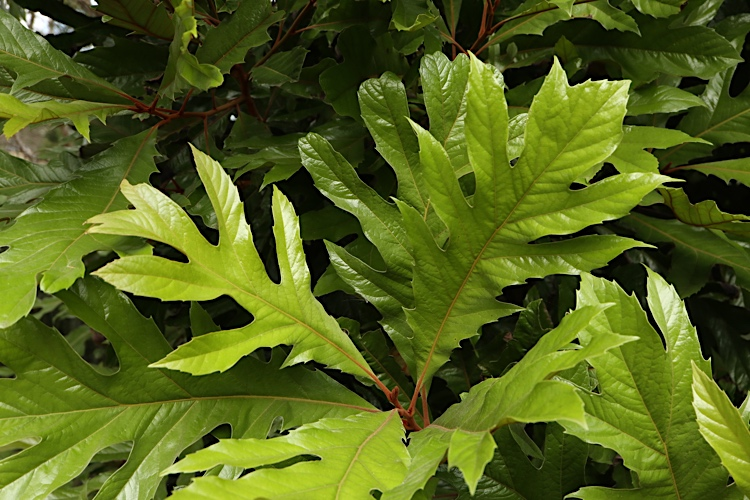
Foliage

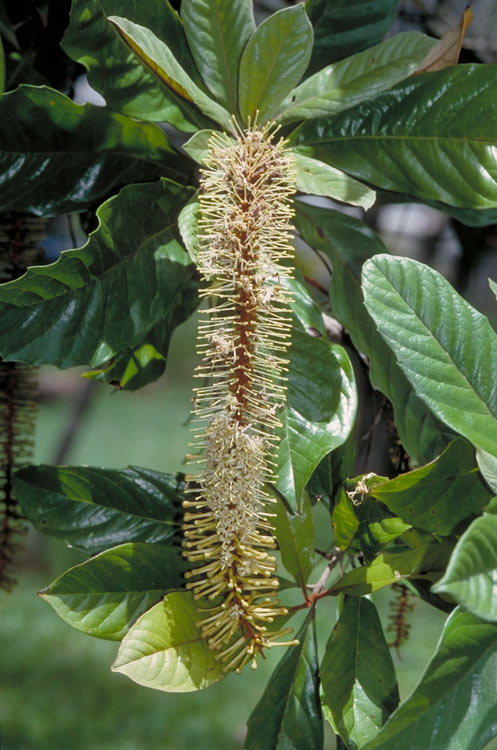
Inflorescence
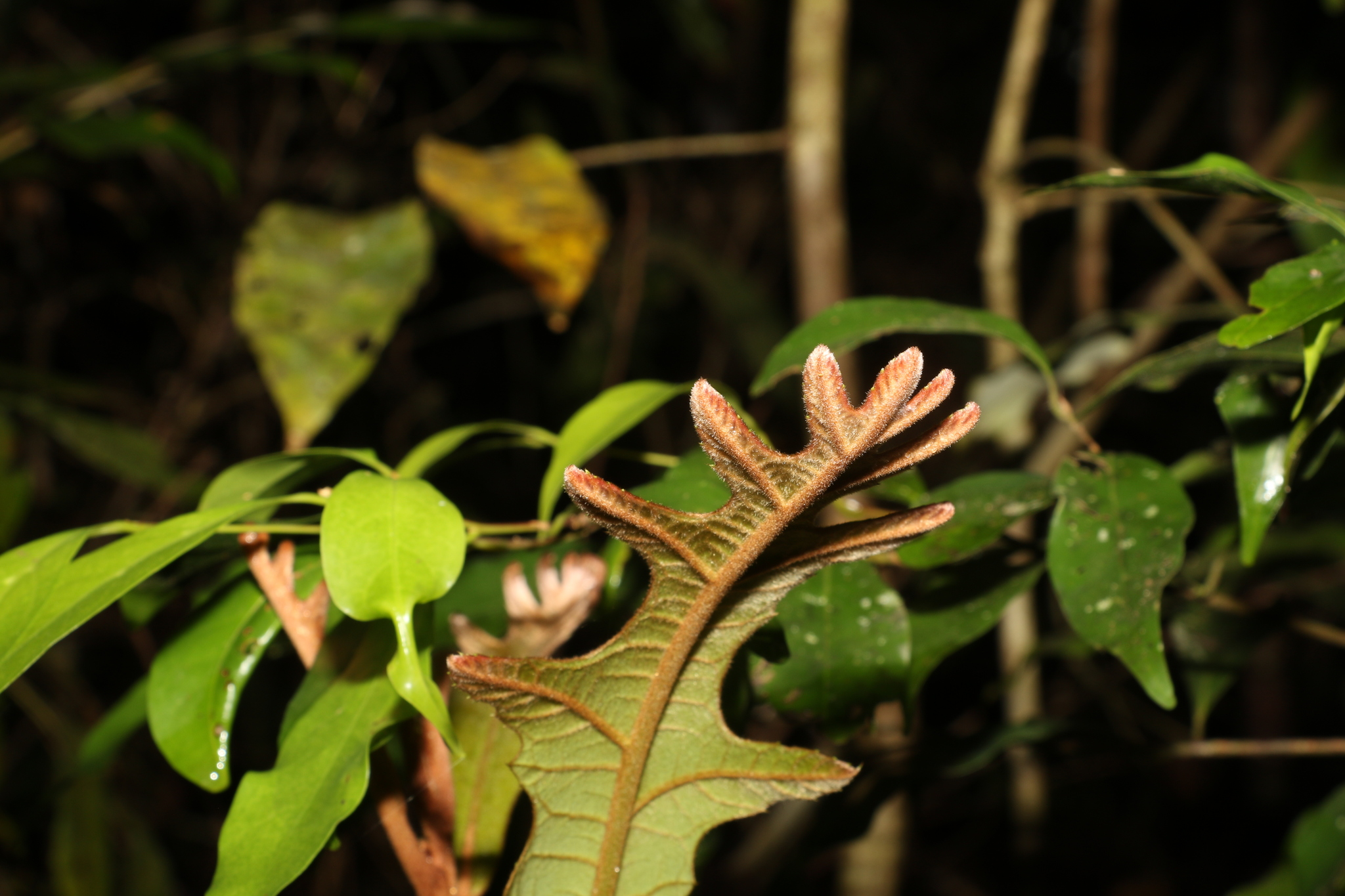
New growth

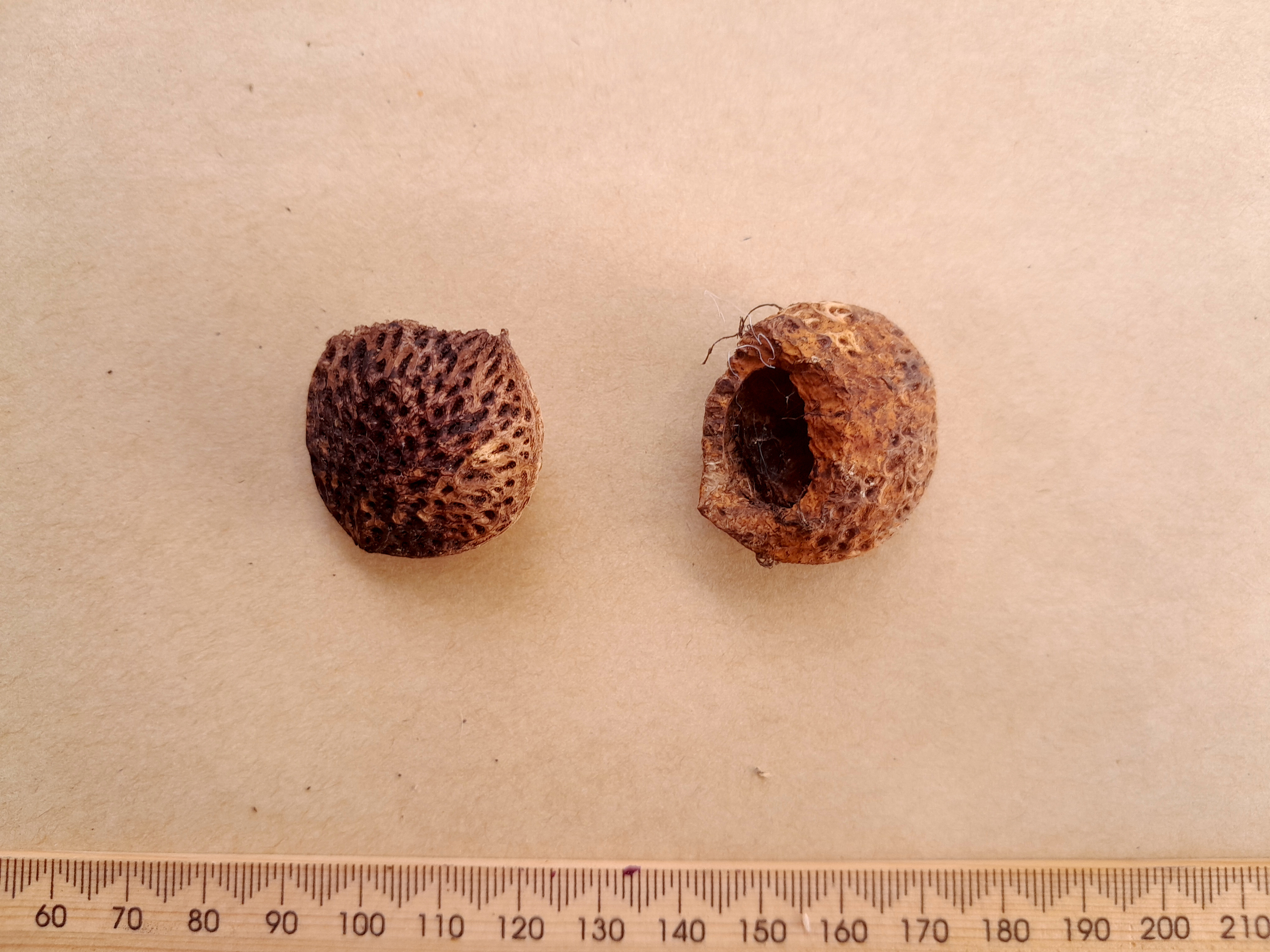
The endocarp, after being gnawed by native rats to access the seed

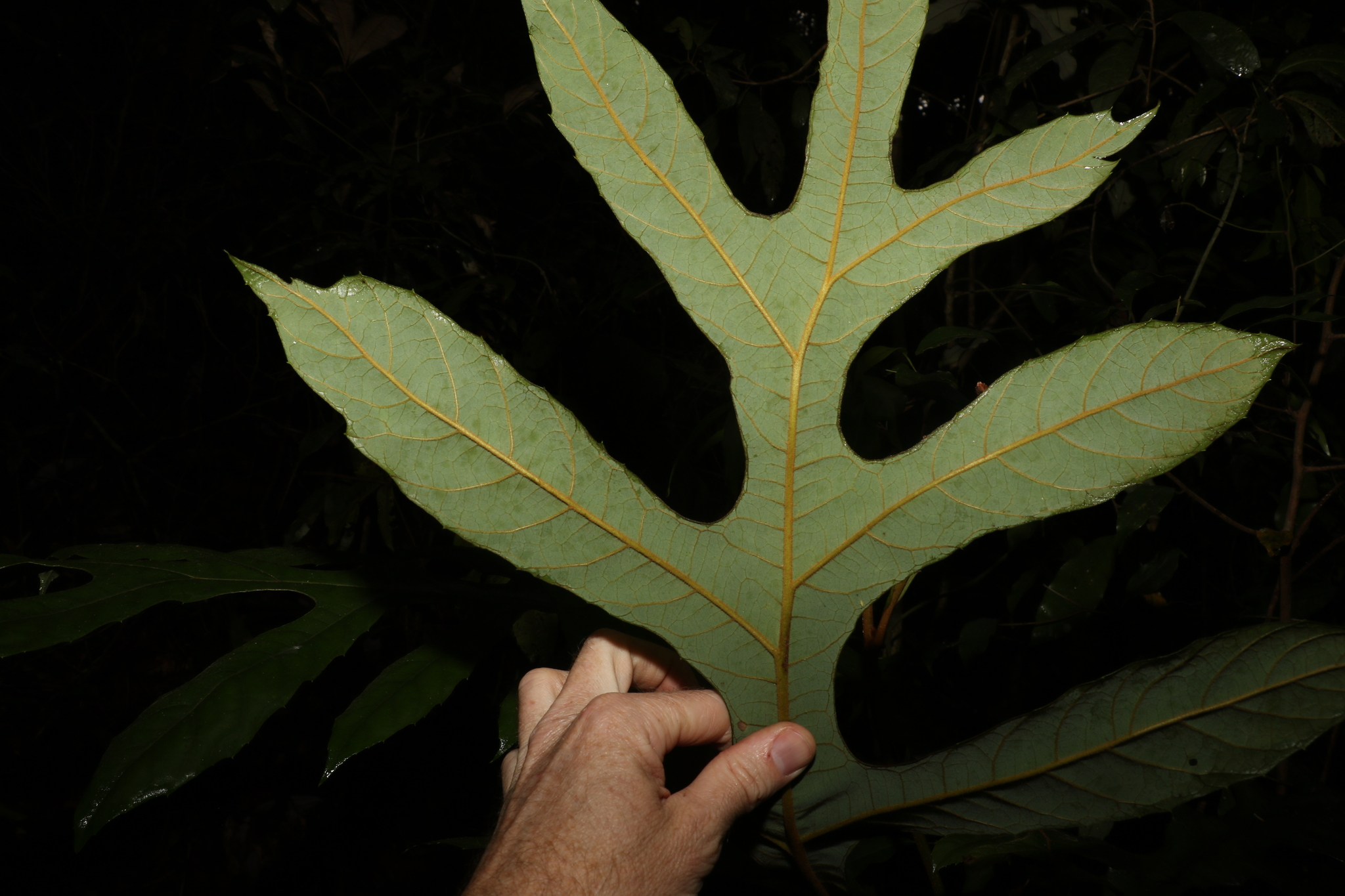
Underside of the leaf

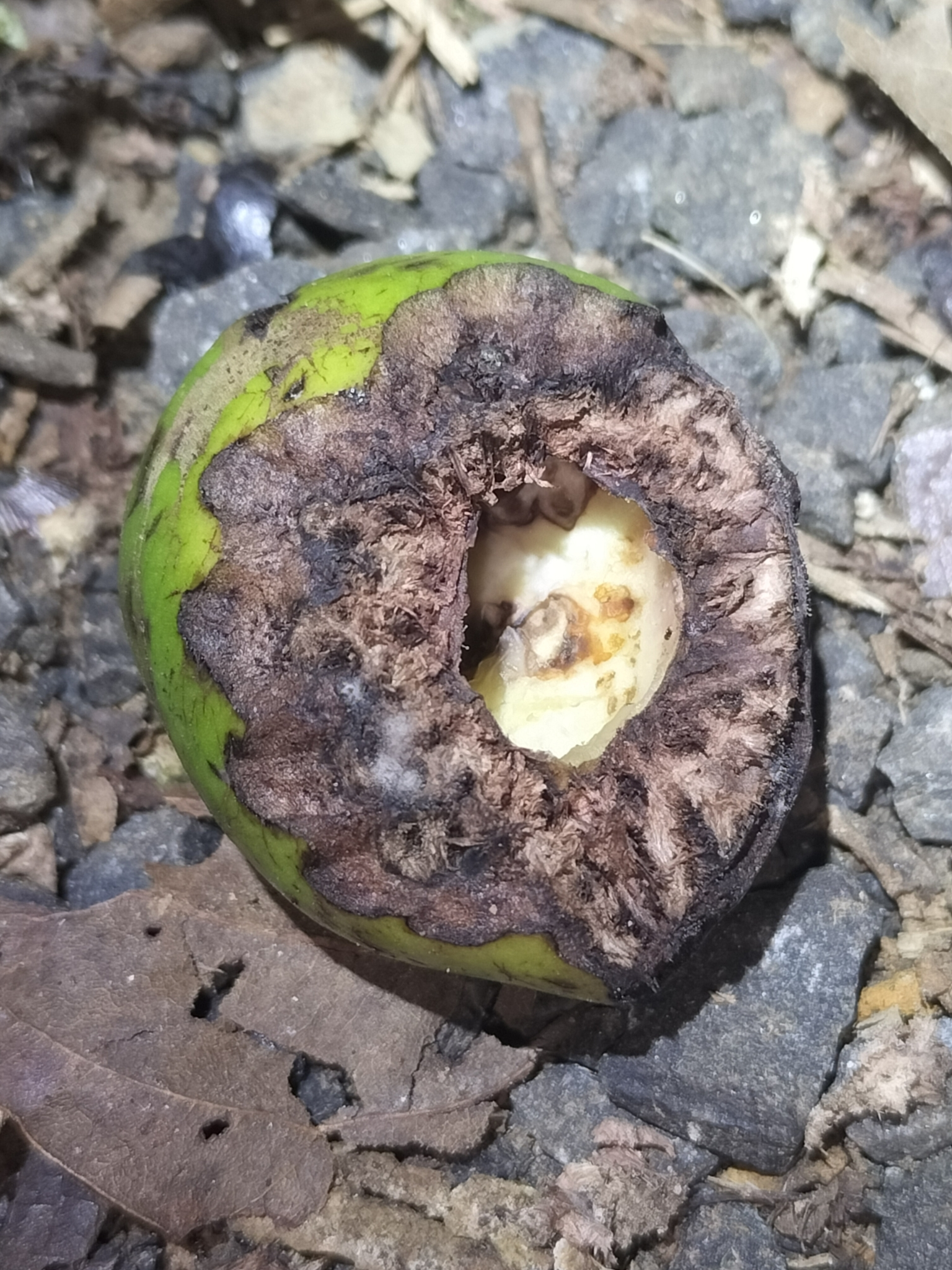
Fruit with partially eaten kernel
