= Venkatrao =

Venkatrao is a given name and a surname. Notable people with the name include:

- Venkatrao K. Badami (1888–c. 1950), Indian agronomist
- Chadalavada Venkatarao (1931–1981), Indian politician
- Ravela Venkatrao (fl. 1978–1983), Indian politician
