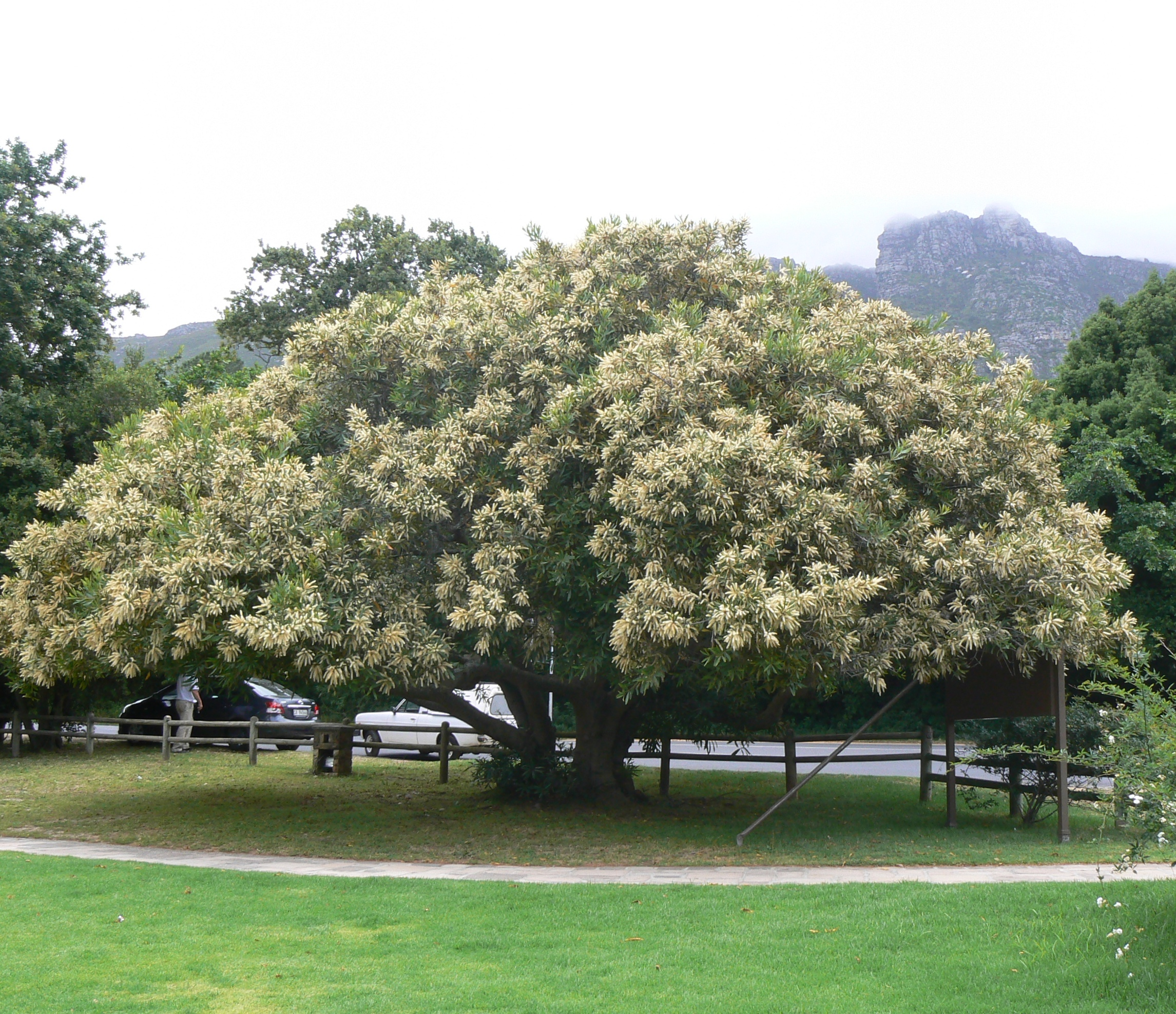
- Brabejum stellatifolium in flower

Conservation status
- Least Concern (IUCN 3.1)

Scientific classification
- Kingdom: Plantae
- Clade: Tracheophytes
- Clade: Angiosperms
- Clade: Eudicots
- Order: Proteales
- Family: Proteaceae
- Subfamily: Grevilleoideae
- Tribe: Macadamieae
- Subtribe: Macadamiinae
- Genus: Brabejum; L.
- Species: B. stellatifolium

Binomial name
- Brabejum stellatifolium L.

= Brabejum =

Monotypic genus of trees from South Africa

Brabejum is a genus of a single species of large evergreen tree, Brabejum stellatifolium in the family Proteaceae, commonly called wild almond, bitter almond or ghoeboontjie. It is restricted in the wild to South Africa's Western Cape province, where it grows in thickets along the banks of streams. The plant is of botanical interest as being Africa's only member of the large grevilleoid subfamily. It is a bushy small tree with branches widely at ground level and numerous erect vigorous stems. Leaves grow up to 6 in (15 cm) long, narrow and bluntly toothed, appear at intervals along the branches, mostly in whorls of 6. In summer, the plant bears white flowers densely crowded on spikes arising from rusty buds at the leaf axils. The fruits to 2 in (5 cm) long, magenta to reddish brown, similar to an almond, appear in autumn. The nut is too bitter to eat; however, in earlier times it was boiled, roasted, and ground to make a "coffee" drink.

This tree has special significance in Cape Town's heritage, as it was used to make Van Riebeeck's Hedge—the Cape's first formal boundary. Parts of this original hedge can still be seen growing today at Kirstenbosch.

== Name ==
Despite its common name, this tree is not a member of the almond family, and is in fact a member of the Proteaceae. It acquired the name "wild almond" simply because its fruits vaguely resemble almonds. The part-Khoi local name "ghoeboontjie" also refers to the fruit kernels and their use in traditional coffee.

The origin of the tree's genus name is uncertain, but its species name "stellatifolium" (meaning "star-leaved" or "stellate-leaved") is a reference to the star-shaped whorls in which its leaves grow. This is sufficiently unusual among tree species, that its whorled phyllotaxis is the most conveniently diagnostic characteristic of Brabejum stellatifolium in regions where the tree is common.

== Appearance ==
Brabejum is a spreading, multi-stemmed, well-shaped evergreen tree. It may grow as tall as 15 meters, but has wide spreading branches and a sprawling habit. The smooth bark is pale greyish-brown and attractively mottled. The green, leathery leaves are toothed and lance-shaped. They appear in whorls of about six, at intervals along the stems, radiating out from the branch like a star. Young leaves are soft, velvety and golden. The tiny, white, sweetly scented, bisexual flowers appear in summer, in dense racemes.

The nut-like fruits look similar to almonds and grow in clusters at the tips of branches. They are densely covered with chocolate-brown velvety hairs. The young fruits are an attractive magenta or lilac-purple colour and mature to the typical brown later in the summer. The fruits are short-lived, germinate quickly and are often dispersed by rivers.

The leaves of Brabejum are frequently disfigured by small knobs. These bubbles are the residences of tiny symbiotic mites. They do not harm the tree, but affected branches can be removed if they are found to be unsightly.

== Distribution ==
The natural range of these trees is confined to the fynbos biome of the Cape, South Africa. Here they are often a component of the local Afro-montane forests.

They prefer moist areas, and commonly occur near streams in sheltered gorges and on lower mountain slopes. In Cape Town they are still abundant on the eastern slopes of Table Mountain, although at one time large numbers were felled in this area to make way for commercial pine plantations. However, despite its limited range, this species is not currently listed as threatened.

The natural occurrence of these trees in South Africa is of considerable interest to biologists. This is because Brabejum has no close relatives in Africa—within the enormous Protea family its nearest relative is the Macadamia tree of Australia and New Caledonia. Its other more distant relatives likewise exist only in Australasia and South America. In fact, not only is this species alone in its genus Brabejum, it is also the only member of its subfamily, Grevilleoideae, in Africa (the proteas that surround it in South Africa are relatively distant relatives).

It seems that the ancient and spectacular Protea family originated in Gondwanaland, hundreds of millions of years ago. The different species were gradually separated by plate tectonics and their descendants still occur on the pieces of land that are now separated by thousands of miles of ocean. Brabejum is the lone survivor of its branch of the family on the African remnant of Gondwanaland.

== Growing Brabejum ==
This is a relatively fast growing tree and is not suitable for the small garden. It has a tendency to spread out sideways and it can be used to form an impenetrable hedge. If correctly pruned, it can form a well-shaped tree. Wherever side branches are cut, more branches will grow from below the cut, so it is readily shaped into a good screen. Older trees form an enormous jungle of giant tangled boughs and sprawling branches, making the trees popular with children.

Brabejum is best propagated by fresh seed. The nuts can simply be pushed into the ground as they are, and they germinate as soon as they are on firm, damp soil. However, the seeds do not survive long if they cannot germinate or if they dry out. Ensure that the seedlings get sufficient water in their first few years, preferably by planting them in a damp, shady area like a river bank.

== Gallery ==
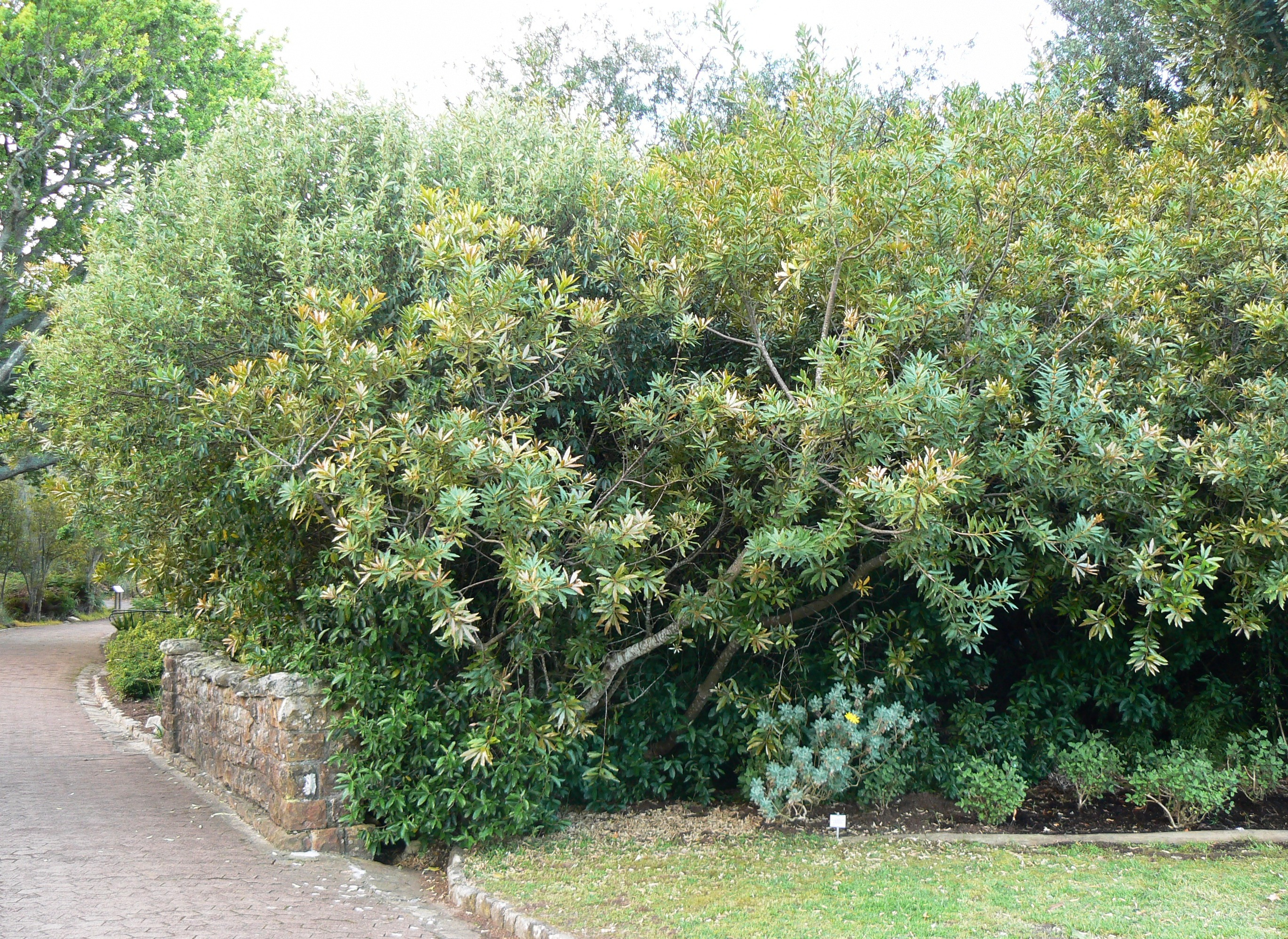
Brabejum growing as a hedge in Cape Town

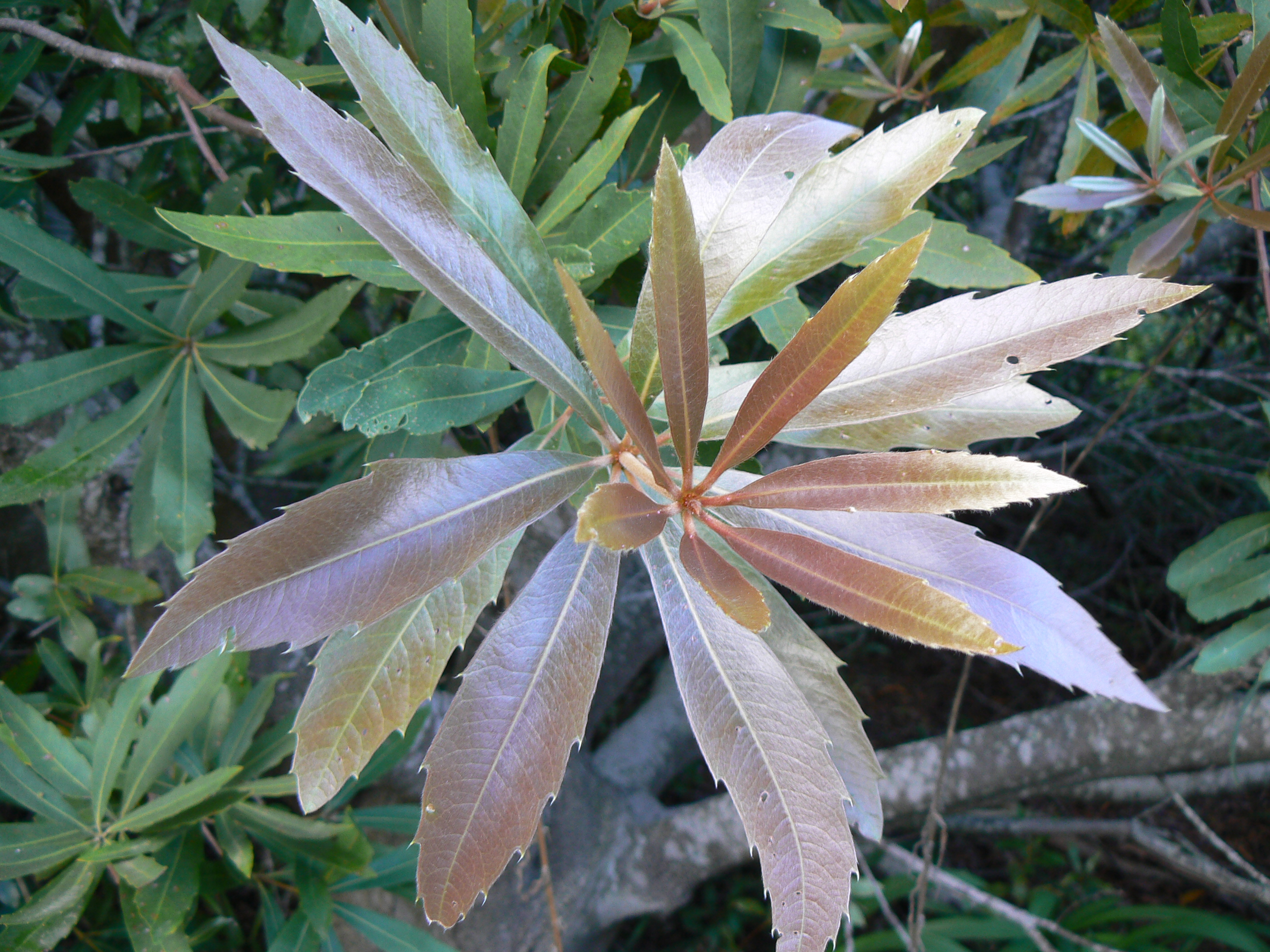
New leaves are soft, golden and velvety

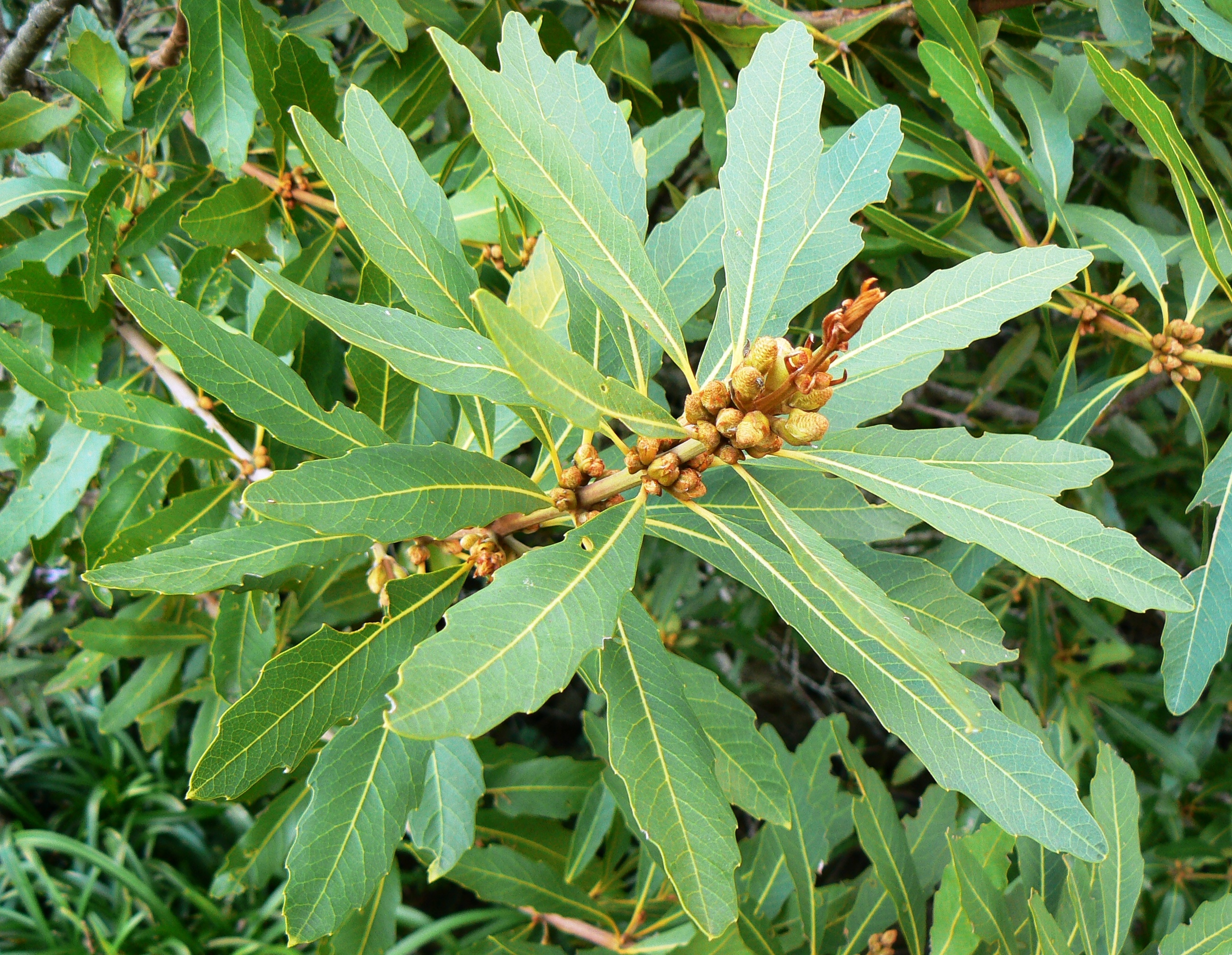
Young flower buds. The name stellatifolium refers to the star-shaped rosettes of its leaves.

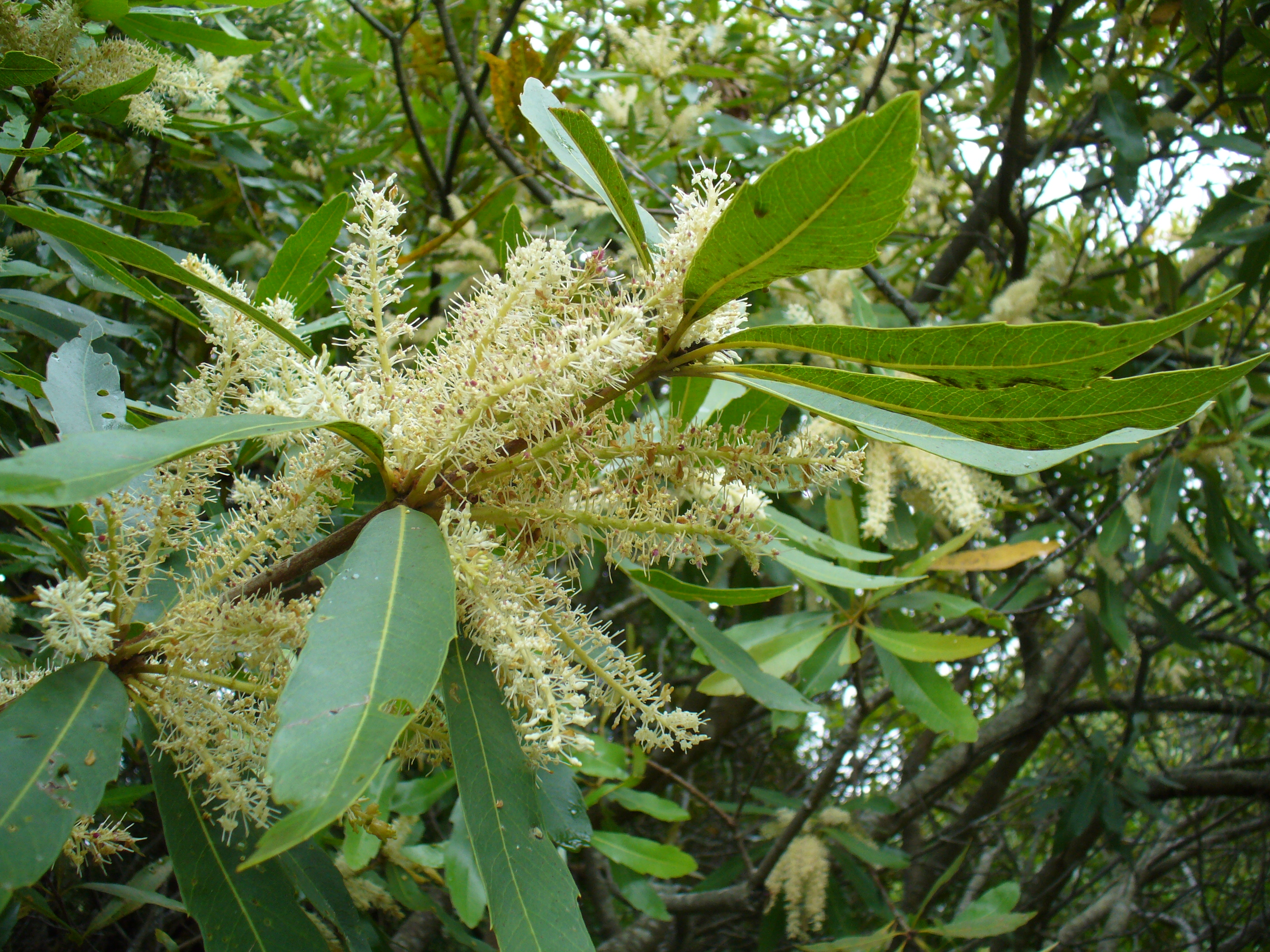
The tree produces sprays of tiny, white, sweetly scented flowers.

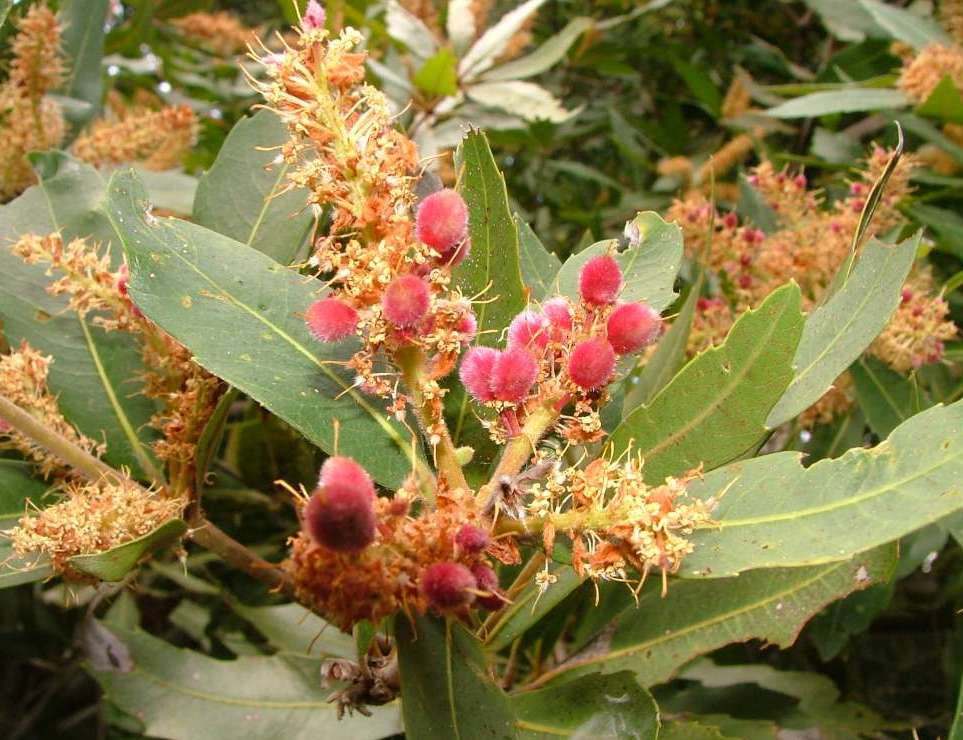
The young nuts are brightly coloured.

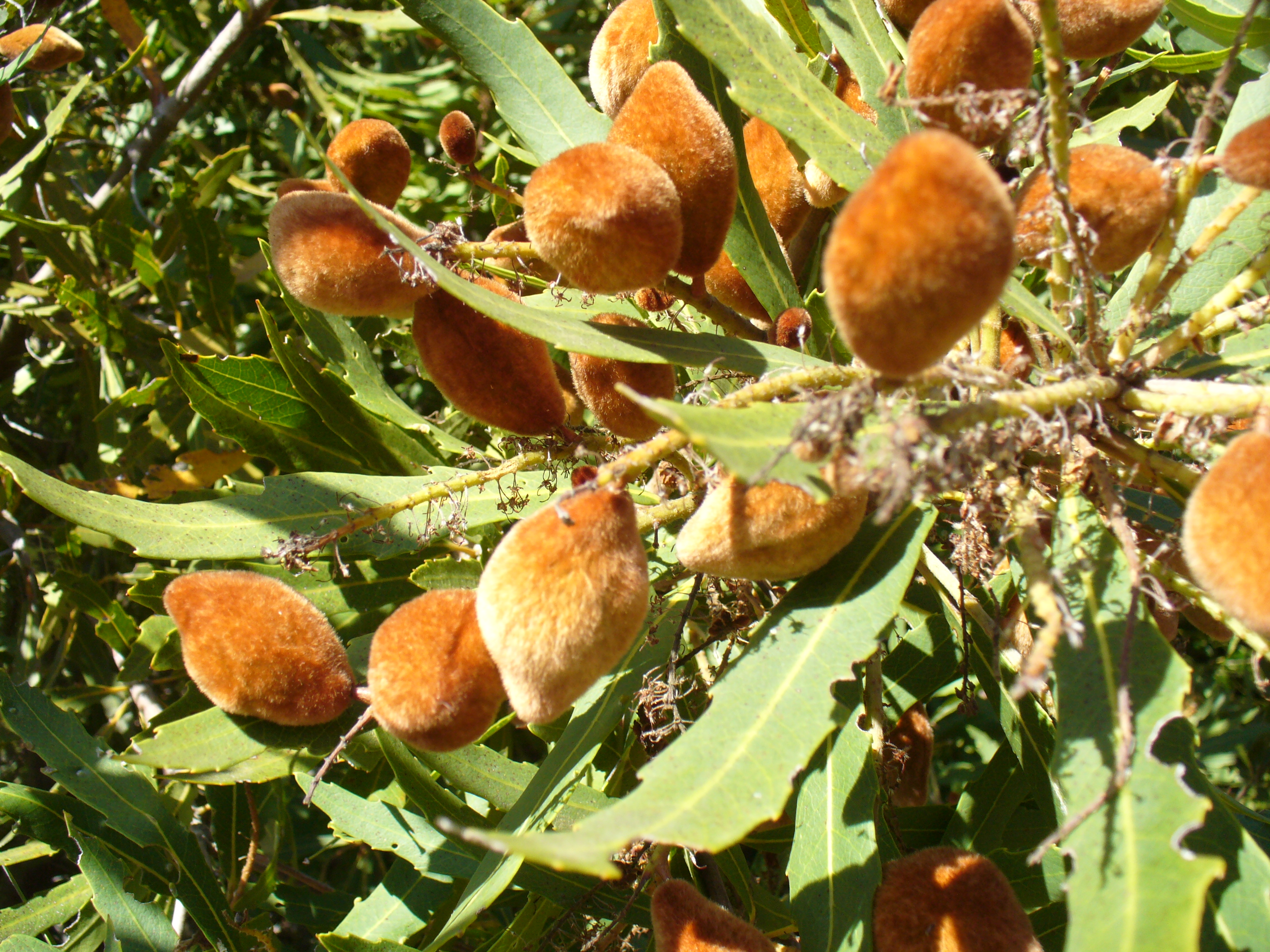
Brabejum's almond-like nuts are inedible to humans, but relished by porcupines.

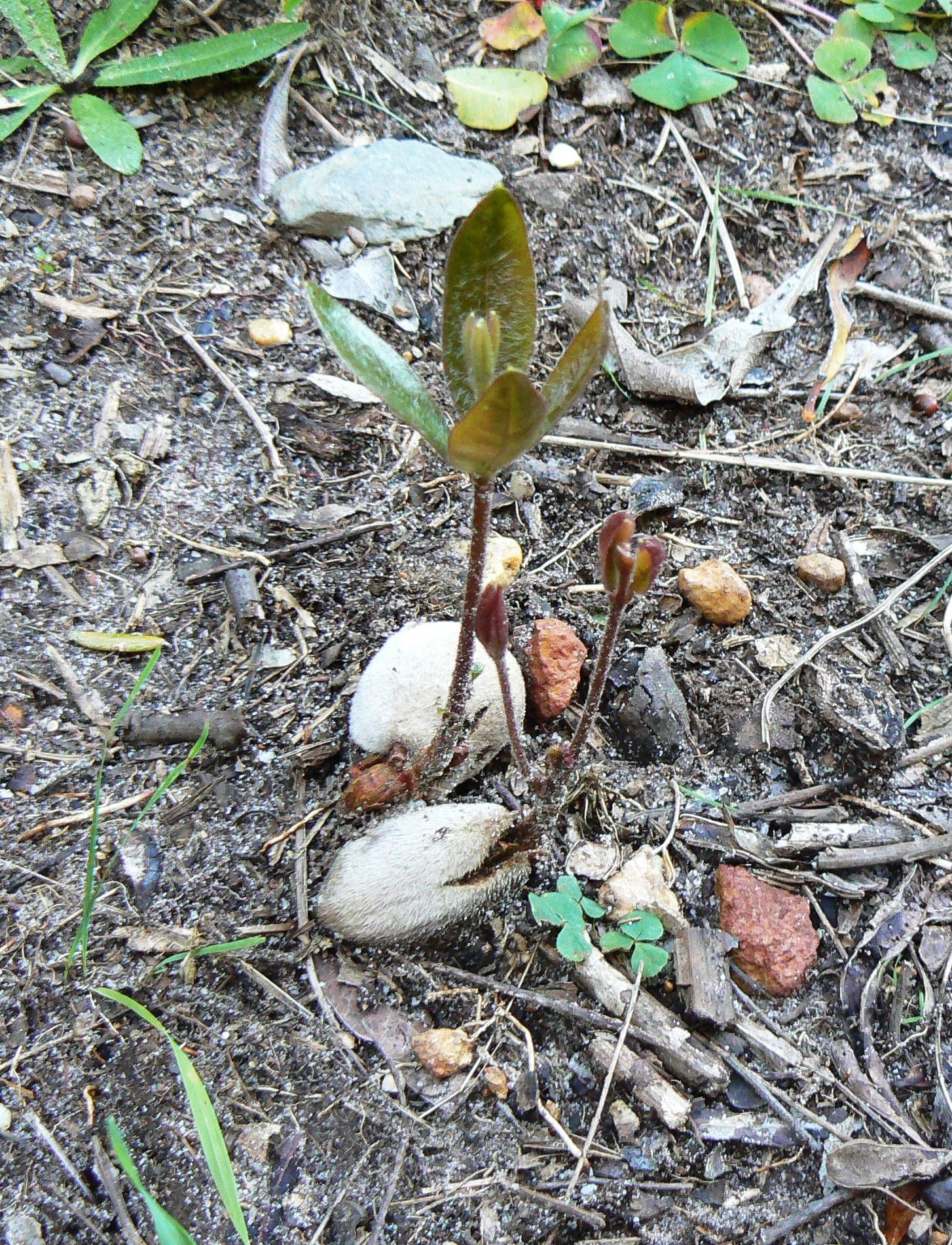
The seeds germinate easily in wet shady areas, even if they are lying on the surface.

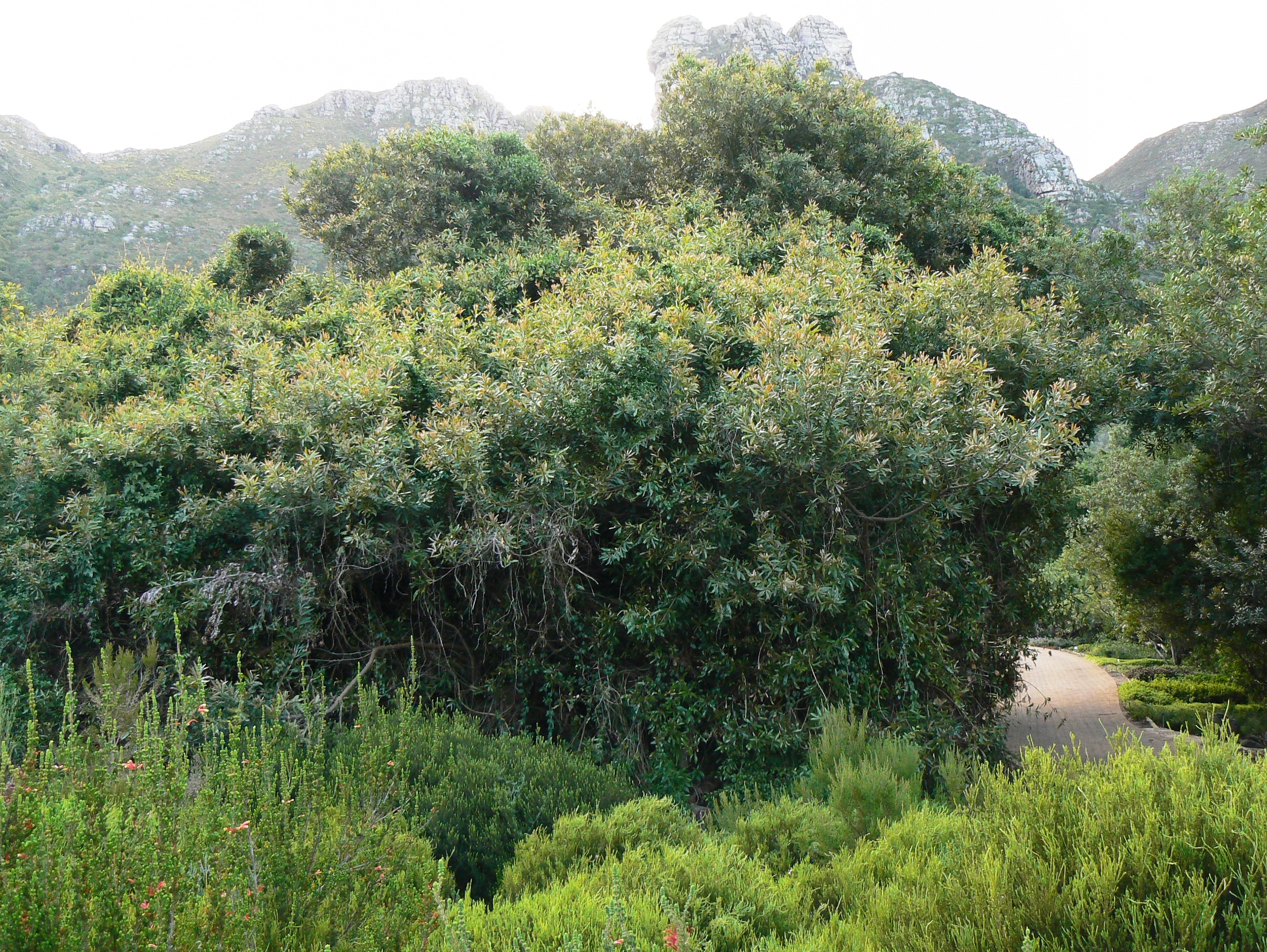
A Brabejum thicket growing on the slopes of Table Mountain

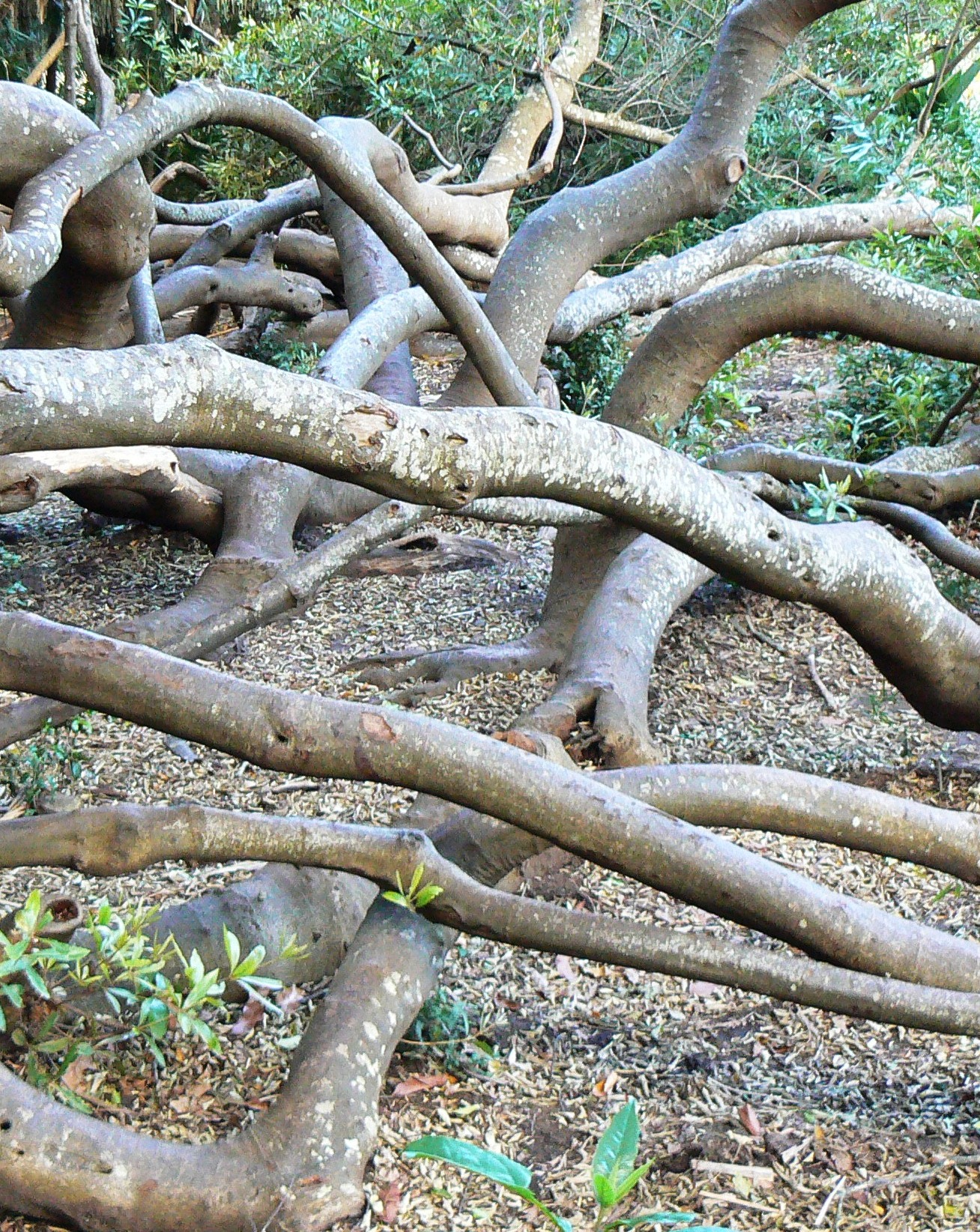
Underneath their canopy, older Brabejum trees form tangles of undulating trunks.

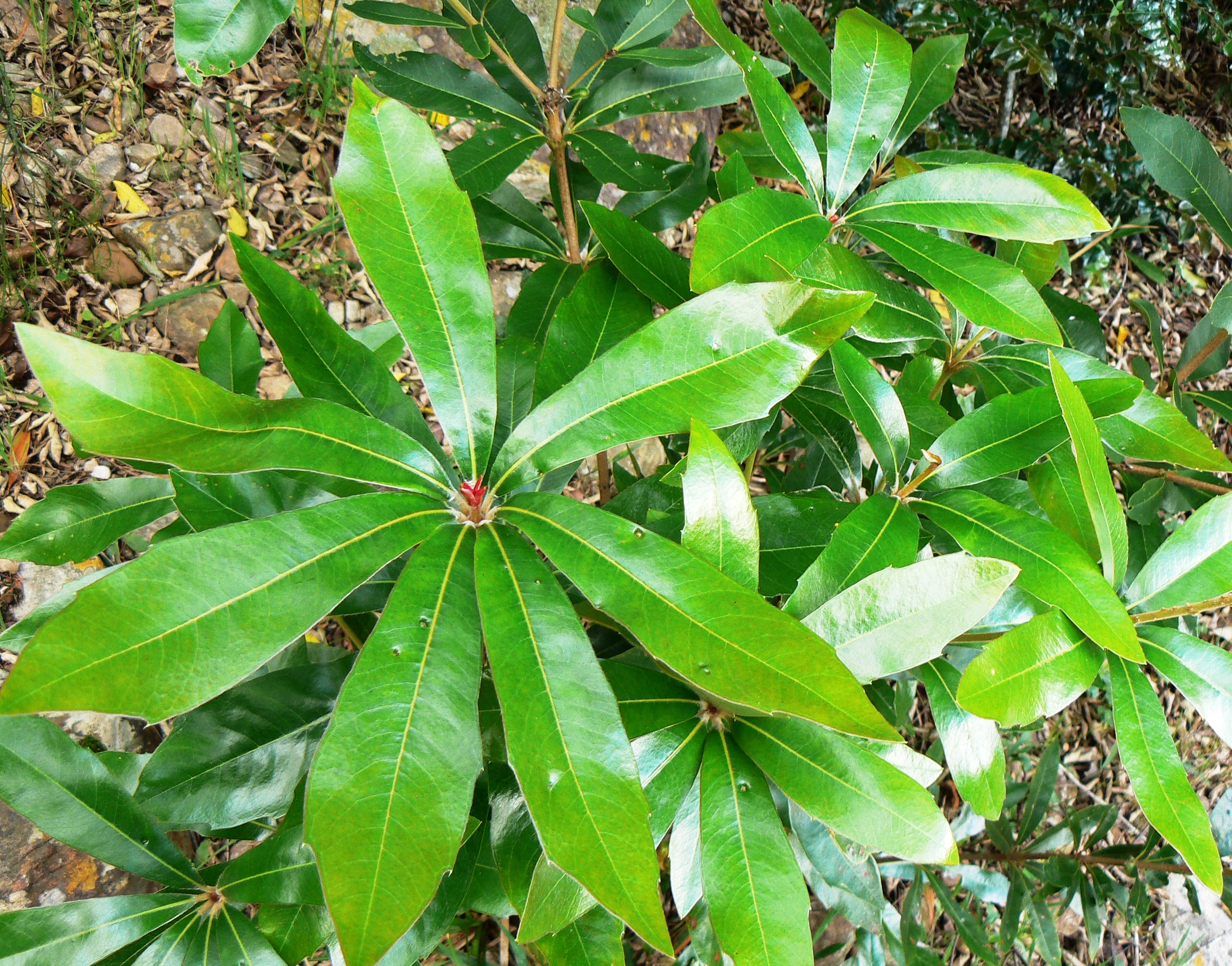
Juvenile tree growing on the forest floor on Table Mountain

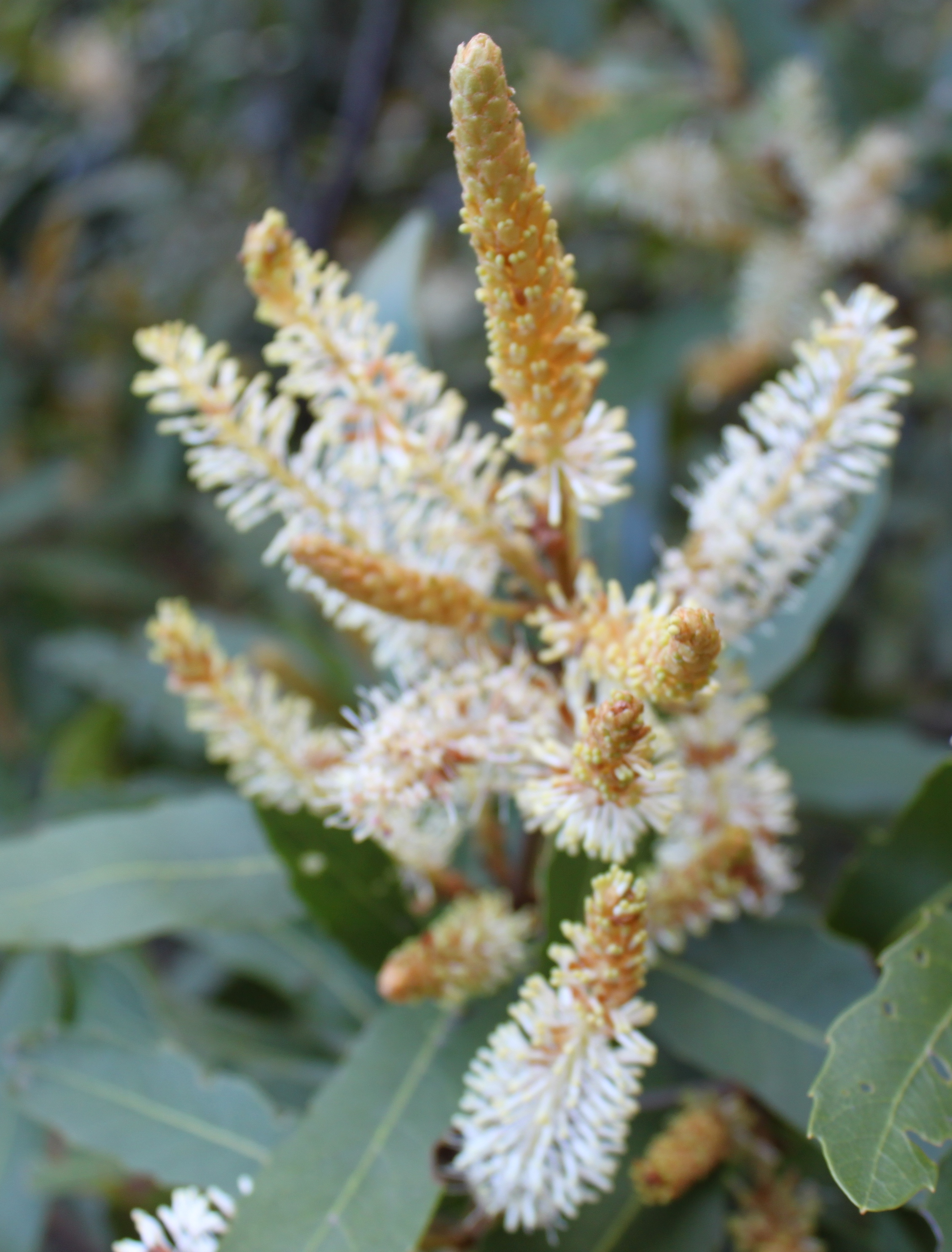
Detail of inflorescence

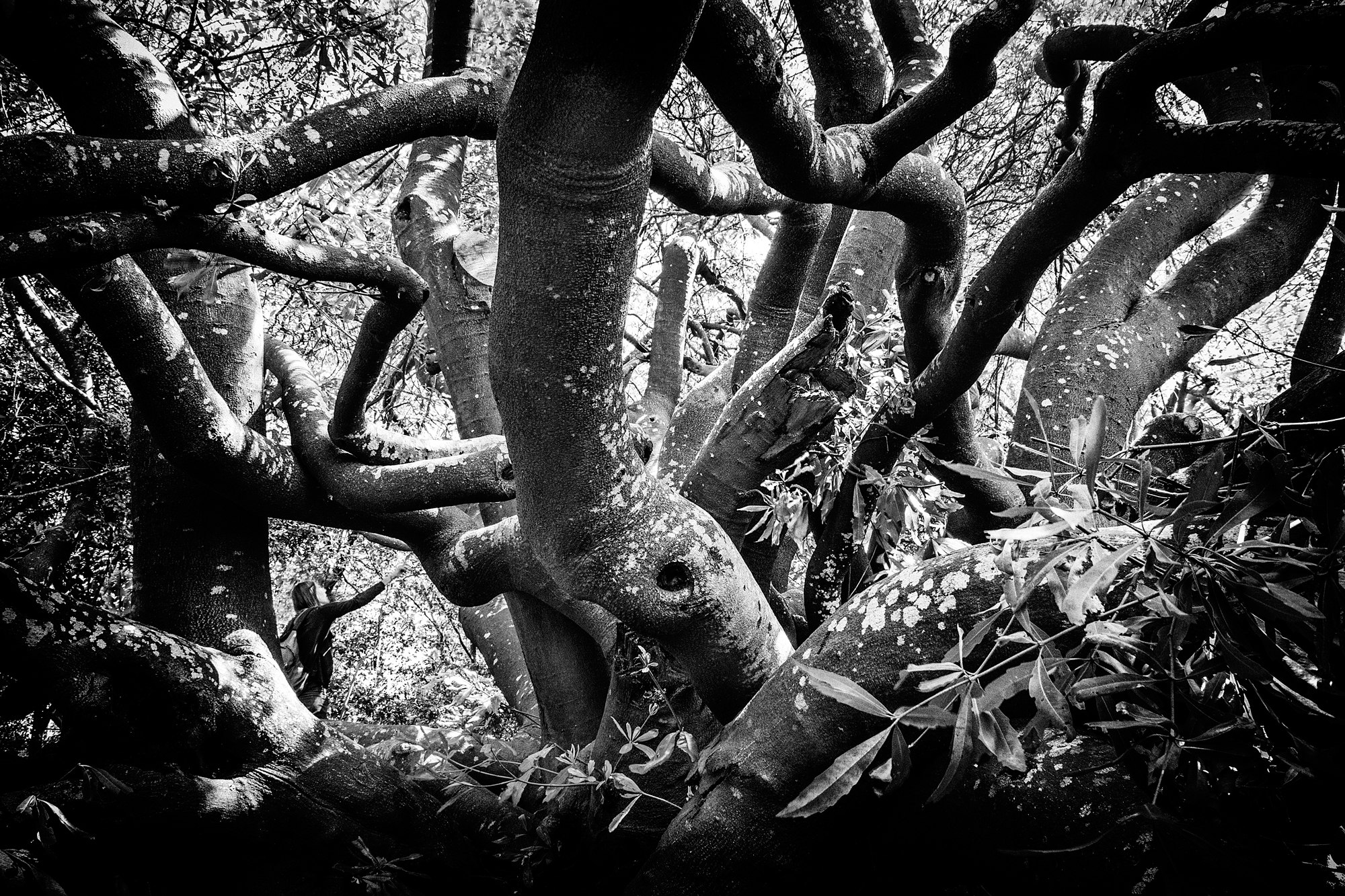
A black-and-white photograph of Van Riebeeck's hedge
