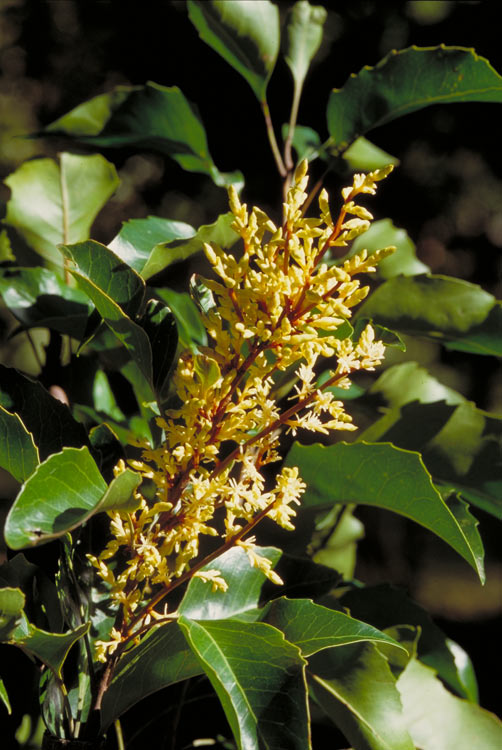
- Inflorescence

Conservation status
- Least Concern (IUCN 3.1)

Scientific classification
- Kingdom: Plantae
- Clade: Tracheophytes
- Clade: Angiosperms
- Clade: Eudicots
- Order: Proteales
- Family: Proteaceae
- Subfamily: Grevilleoideae
- Tribe: Roupaleae
- Subtribe: Roupalinae
- Genus: Neorites; L.S.Sm.
- Species: N. kevedianus

Binomial name
- Neorites kevedianus L.S.Sm.

= Neorites =

Monotypic genus of plants

Neorites is a plant genus containing a single species in the family Proteaceae. The sole species Neorites kevedianus, commonly called fishtail oak or fishtail silky oak, is a tall tree endemic to the wet tropics rainforests of north eastern Queensland, Australia.

== Taxonomy and naming ==
Queensland botanist Lindsay Smith named the species in 1969, based on a specimen collected near Kuranda in 1955 by Queensland forestry officers Kevin J. White and H. Edgar Volck. Smith coined the species name from the first names of the finders.

Peter H. Weston and Nigel Barker refined the classification of the Proteaceae in 2006, incorporating molecular data. Here, Neorites emerged as closely related to the genera Orites and Roupala. They thus placed the three genera in the subtribe Roupalinae, conceding that the next closest relatives of this group is unclear. This group lies within the subfamily Grevilleoideae. Clock dating with molecular and fossil data indicated ancestors of Neorites and the South American genus Roupala may have diverged in the mid-Oligocene around 30 million years ago, and that this lineage in turn separated from the ancestors of Orites in the late Eocene around 36 million years ago.

A compound-leaved fossil species has been recovered from the middle Eocene Golden Grove site in Adelaide that closely resembles Neorites kevedianus. Although abundant at this site, it has not been recovered elsewhere.

== Description ==
Neorites kevedianus is a tree reaching 15–30 m (49–98 ft) in height. The new growth is covered in brownish fur.

== Distribution and habitat ==
Neorites kevedianus is native to north Queensland, where it is found in rainforest on volcanic soils at altitudes from 150 to 1,150 metres (490 to 3,770 ft) above sea level.
