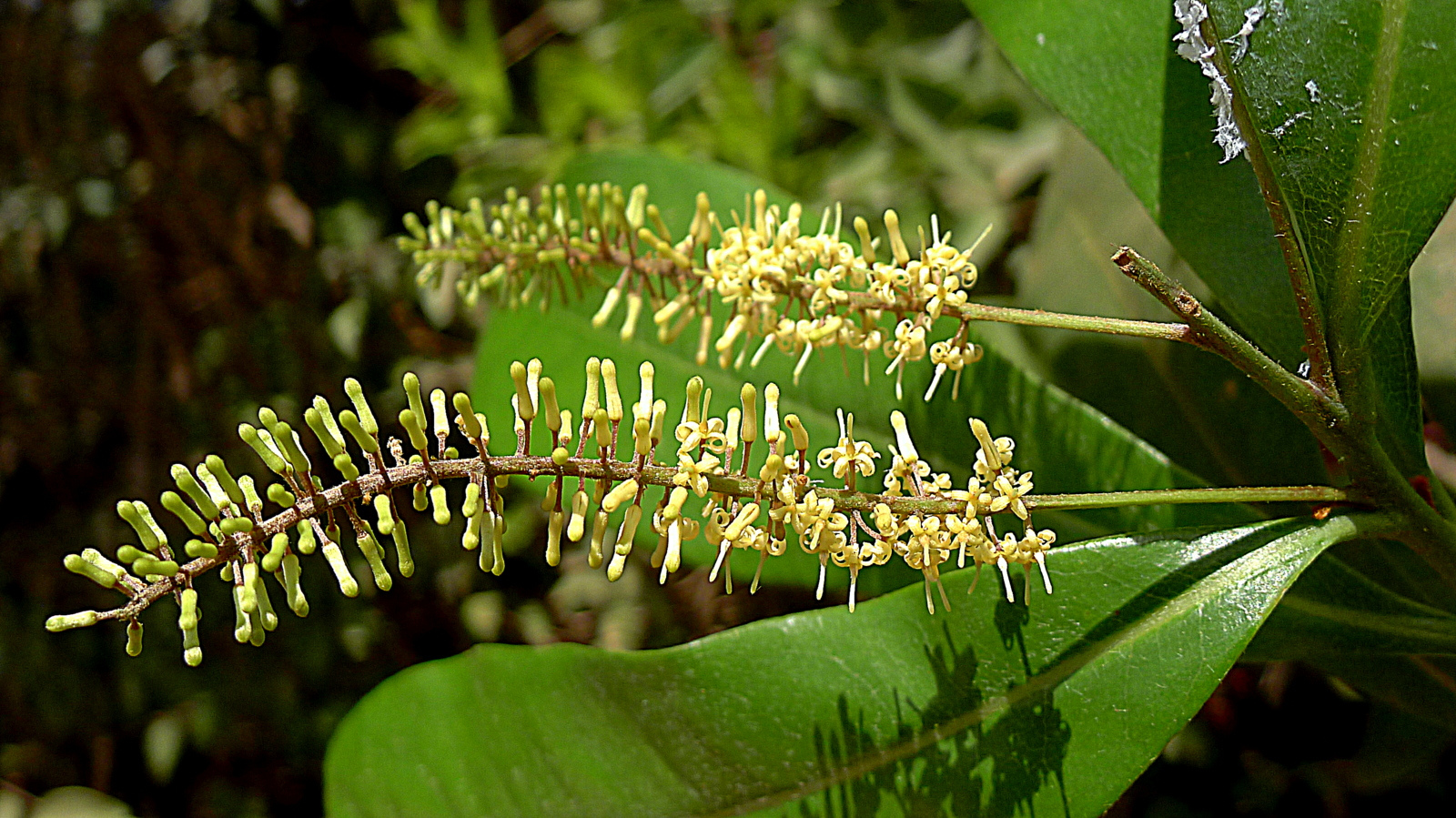
- Panopsis rubescens

Scientific classification
- Kingdom: Plantae
- Clade: Embryophytes
- Clade: Tracheophytes
- Clade: Angiosperms
- Clade: Eudicots
- Order: Proteales
- Family: Proteaceae
- Subfamily: Grevilleoideae
- Tribe: Macadamieae
- Subtribe: Macadamiinae
- Genus: Panopsis; Salisb. ex Knight

= Panopsis =

Genus of trees from Central and South America

Panopsis is a genus of trees in the family Proteaceae. It is native to tropical regions in the Americas. Common areas where Panopsis species are seen to grow in are described to have elevated groundwater levels.

== Species ==
Some of the species in this genus, which occur in Central and South America are listed below. There is also a recently described species called Panopsis magnifruta.

- Panopsis cinnamomea Pittier
- Panopsis mucronata Cuatrec.
- Panopsis multiflora (Schott ex Spreng.) Ducke
- Panopsis parimensis Steyerm.
- Panopsis pearcei Rusby
- Panopsis polystachya (Kunth) Kuntze
- Panopsis ptariana Steyerm.
- Panopsis rubescens (Pohl) Pittier
- Panopsis sessilifolia (Rich.) Sandwith
- Panopsis suaveolens (Klotzsch) Pittier
- Panopsis tepuiana Steyerm.
- Panopsis yolombo (Pos.-Arang.) Killip
