= Megahertzia =

Scientific classification
- Kingdom: Plantae
- Clade: Tracheophytes
- Clade: Angiosperms
- Clade: Eudicots
- Order: Proteales
- Family: Proteaceae
- Subfamily: Grevilleoideae
- Tribe: Roupaleae
- Genus: Megahertzia; A.S.George & B.Hyland
- Species: M. amplexicaulis

Binomial name
- Megahertzia amplexicaulis A.S.George & B.Hyland

Monotypic genus of tree endemic to Australia

Megahertzia is a monotypic genus of flowering plants in the family Proteaceae. The sole species, Megahertzia amplexicaulis, is endemic to Queensland. It is found only in part of the Wet Tropics World Heritage Area between the Daintree River and Cape Tribulation.

The name Megahertzia is a pun on Roaring Meg Creek, where one of the original specimens was collected. It is derived from the Greek megas (meaning large) and hertz, the unit of measurement for sound frequency.
