= Venkatraopet =

Village in Telangana, India

Venkatraopet is a village in Bheemaram mandal, Jagtial district, in the Indian state of Telangana.
