= Venkatraopalle =

Coordinates: 18.43459°N 78.96977°E

- Town
- Location in Telangana, India Venkatraopalle (India)
- Country: India
- State: Telangana
- Region: Deccan
- District: Karimnagar

Languages
  - Official: Telugu
- Time zone: UTC+5:30 (IST)
- Vehicle registration: TS
- Website: telangana.gov.in

Venkatraopalle is a municipal village in Boinpalle mandal of Karimnagar district in the state of Telangana, India. It lies exactly 18 km away from Karimnagar, located on the highway from Karimnagar to Vemulawada.
