= Ravela Venkatrao =

Indian politician

Member of the Legislative Assembly for Sattenapalli
- In office 1978–1983

Ravela Venkatrao served as the Member of the Legislative Assembly for Sattenapalli constituency in Andhra Pradesh, India, between 1978 and 1983. He represented the INC (I).
