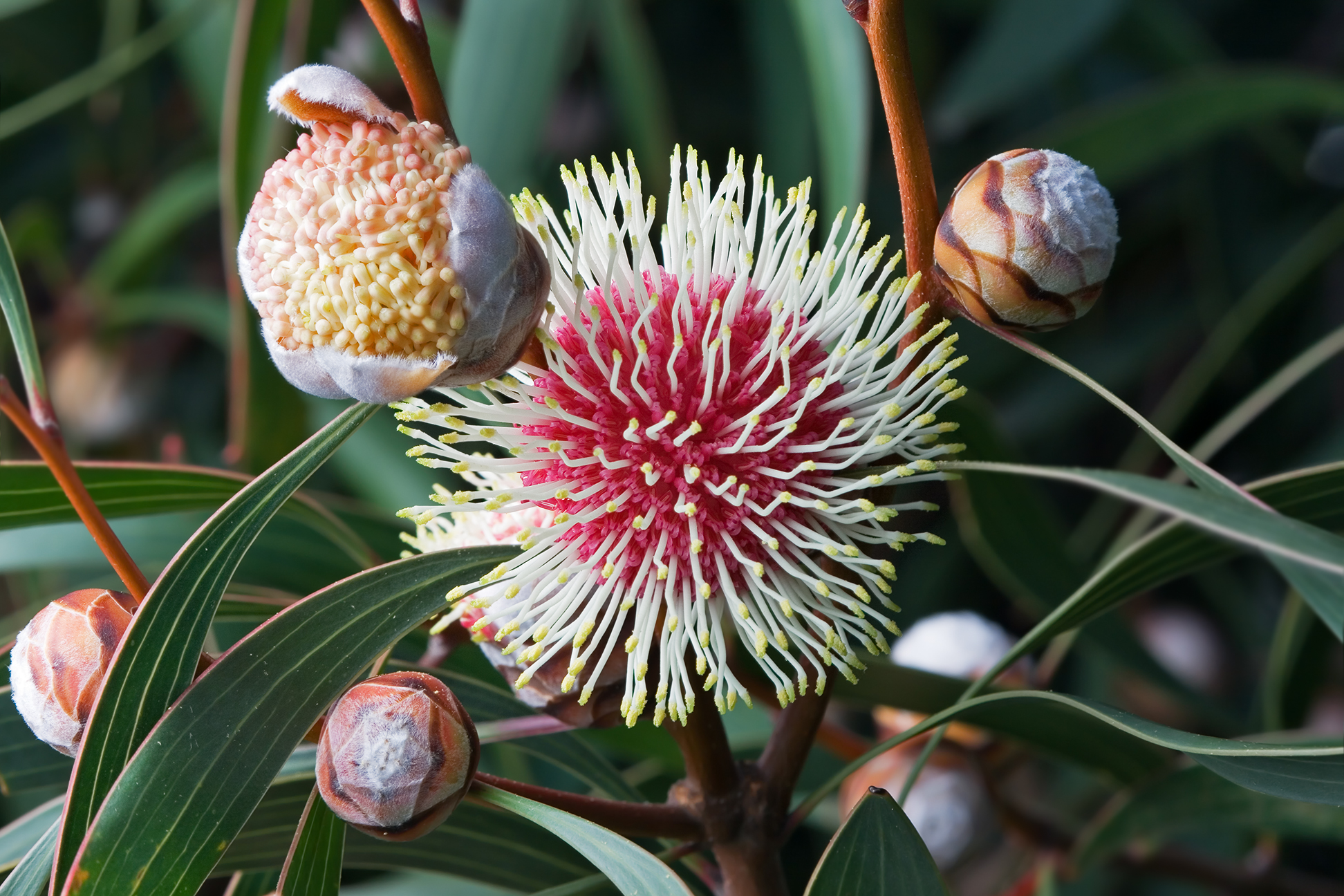
- Hakea laurina inflorescences at different stages of maturity

Conservation status
- Vulnerable (IUCN 3.1)

Scientific classification
- Kingdom: Plantae
- Clade: Tracheophytes
- Clade: Angiosperms
- Clade: Eudicots
- Order: Proteales
- Family: Proteaceae
- Genus: Hakea
- Species: H. laurina

Binomial name
- Hakea laurina R.Br.
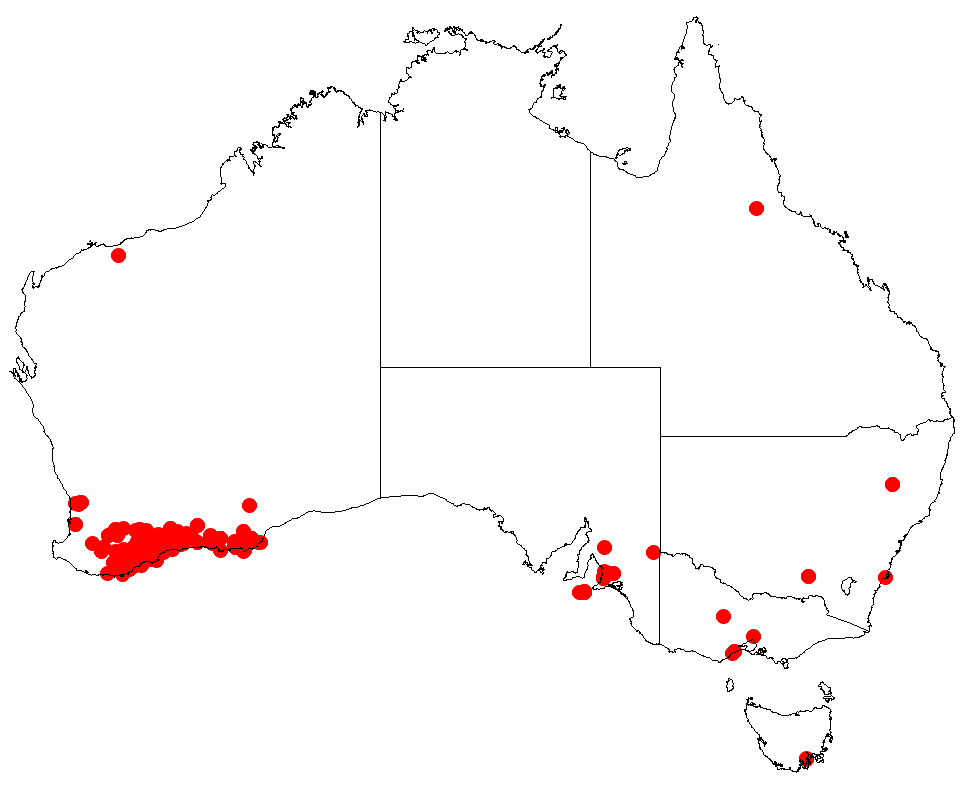
- Occurrence data from AVH

= Hakea laurina =

Species of plant endemic to Western Australia

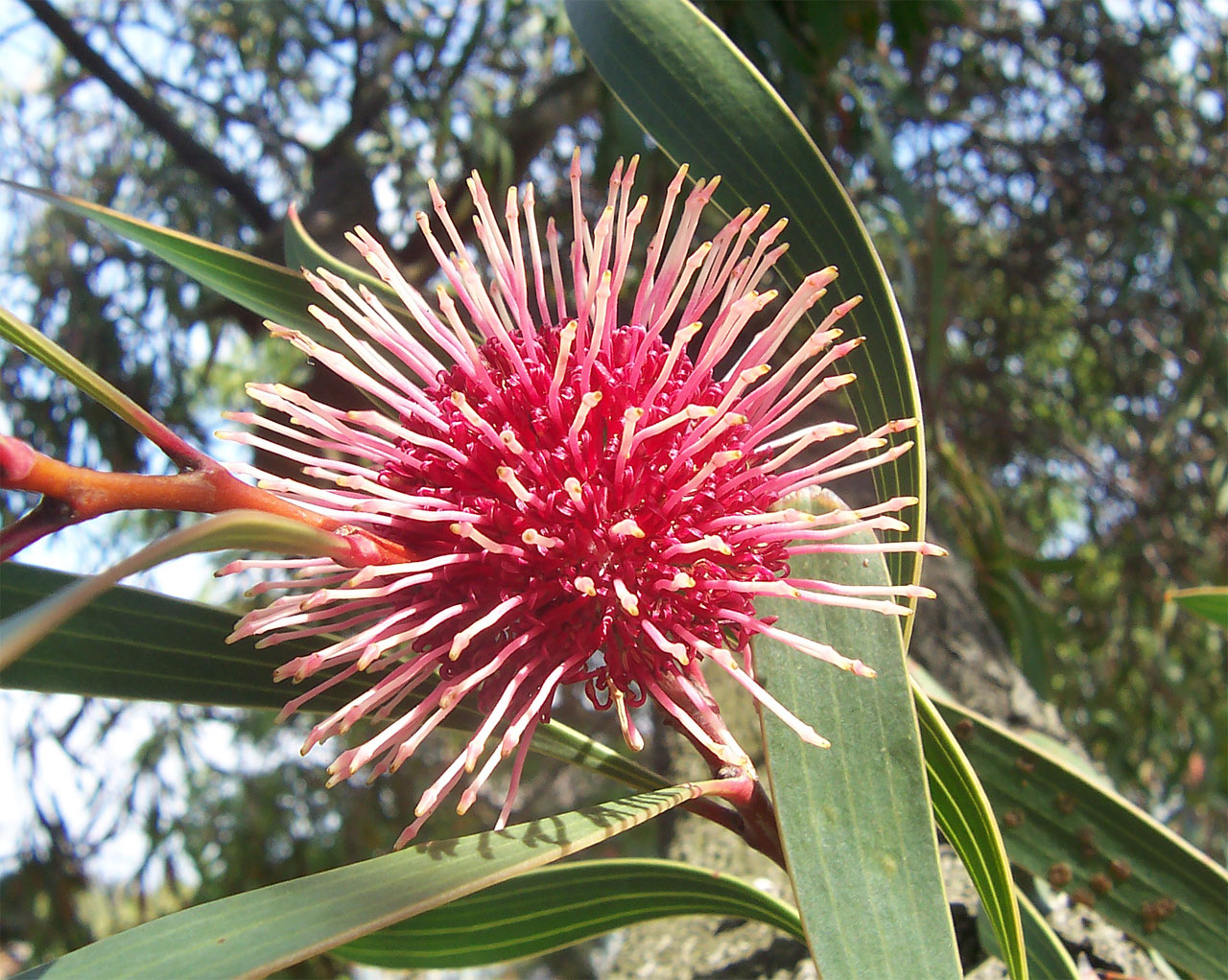
Detail showing crimson flower head

Hakea laurina is a shrub or small tree commonly known as kodjet or pin-cushion hakea and is endemic to Western Australia. The Noongar name for the plant is kodjet or kojet. It has red and cream conspicuous globular flowers and lance shaped leaves.

== Description ==
Hakea laurina is an upright shrub or small tree with smooth grey bark, 2.5–6.0 m (8 ft 2 in – 19 ft 8 in) high, 3–5 m (9.8–16.4 ft) wide and does not form a lignotuber. The inflorescence consists of 120-190 conspicuous white, deep pink or red pin cushion shaped flowers in the leaf axils. The pedicels are 5.5–9.5 mm (0.22–0.37 in) long and smooth. The perianth is dark pink to red, the pistil 14–19.5 mm (0.55–0.77 in) long, cream-white or occasionally red or dark pink. The flower buds are enclosed in scale-like bracts. Flowering occurs from April to July. The leaves are simple, slightly blue green, flat, smooth, margins entire, lance or egg-shaped and taper to a blunt point at the tip. The leaves are arranged alternately along the branches, 7–21 cm (2.8–8.3 in) long, 6–29 mm (0.24–1.14 in) wide on a stem 1–2 cm (0.39–0.79 in) long and narrowing at the base. The fruit are in clusters of 1–10 per axil, 2.2–3.8 cm (0.87–1.50 in) long, 1.6–2.3 cm (0.63–0.91 in) wide, egg-shaped, smooth, occasionally with rough pitting and ending in a short beak.

== Taxonomy and naming ==
Hakea laurina was first formally described in 1830 by Robert Brown and the description was published in Supplementum primum prodromi florae Novae Hollandiae. The specific epithet is derived from the Latin laurus with reference to the resemblance of the leaves to laurel.

== Distribution ==
Pincushion hakea is endemic to the coastal south-west of Western Australia, the northernmost range being Narrogin and extending east to Esperance.

The habitat is often sand plains, sometimes occurring on sandy clay; most recorded specimens are in the southern districts of its botanical province. Introduced populations are known to exist on Kangaroo Island and in the Mount Lofty Ranges in South Australia.

== Cultivation ==
The plant, which is propagated from seeds, is used in cultivation in the eastern states of Australia, and as a hedging or street plant in America and Italy. Adaptable to a number of soil types, the plant is also tolerant of frost. The uses of this species include ornament and shading in public streets, wildlife habitat, windbreaks, and control of soil erosion.

== Weed potential ==
Hakea laurina is a popular garden shrub in south-eastern Australia but it has escaped cultivation and is regarded as an environmental weed in Victoria and South Australia. It readily invades natural habitats, being a particular problem in coastal environments. Infestations smother indigenous vegetation and prevent the regrowth of local native species. It regenerates prolifically after fires because its seeds are stimulated to germinate by heat.

== Conservation status ==
In its natural habitat, Hakea laurina is listed as Vulnerable on the IUCN Red List of Threatened Species due to a suspected decline of at least 30% over the past three generations of the species, mainly due to land clearing for agriculture. The remnant subpopulations along road verges are threatened by further clearance for road maintenance, as well as weed invasion, pollution from phosphate fertilisers used in farming and altered fire regimes resulting in insufficient fire frequency.

The species is found within the protected areas of Cape Arid National Park, Fitzgerald River National Park, Stirling Range National Park and Lake Magenta Nature Reserve. Additional conservation actions required for the species include maintaining and managing threats of the populations along road verges, as well as regular monitoring of populations.
