= Venkatraopally(B) =

Venkatraopally(B) is a village in Chityal mandal of Hanamkonda district in the northern region of the Indian state of Telangana.
