= Chellapilla Venkata Rao =

Indian botanist

- Born: 21 November 1910; Bobbili, India
- Died: 26 November 1971
- Citizenship: India
- Education: Andhra University, Banaras University, University of Tasmania
- Known for: Proteaceae, Plant Embryology, Plant anatomy
- Scientific career
- Fields: Botany, Proteaceae, Sterculiaceae, Malvales
- Workplaces: Andhra University, National Institute of Science of India, University of Tasmania, Hindu College Postgraduate Centre, Guntur
- Doctoral advisors: A.C. Joshi, H.N. Barber

Chellapilla Venkata Rao (1910–1971) was an Indian botanist.

== Education ==
He was awarded his PhD from the University of Tasmania in 1957 with a thesis entitled Cytotaxonomic studies in the Proteaceae.

== Academic appointments ==
He worked in the Department of Botany, Andhra University, Waltair, from 1948 to 1967. During this period he worked for three years on the Palmaceae as a senior post-doctoral fellow of the National Institute of Science of India. From 1955 to 1957, under the Colombo plan as a post-doctoral research scholar working with H.N. Barber at the University of Tasmania, he received a PhD (in addition to his earlier D.Sc. from Andhra University – for work on Malvaceae). From 1967 until his death in 1971, he was head of the department of botany, Andhra University Postgraduate Centre, Guntur, India, where he both taught and wrote.

== Research interests ==
A major interest was the family Proteaceae, and in 1971, CSIR published his monograph on the family. The monograph was said by J.P.Rourke of the Compton Herbarium, himself a specialist in Proteaceae, to be

a broad survey of the whole family on the basis of the anatomy and morphology of the leaves, stems, inflorescences, flowers, and fruits of representative species from most of the living genera. Embryological features are treated in detail and accounts of the cytology and fossil records are also provided....As the leading researcher on this family, Venkata Rao has, not unnaturally, drawn heavily on his own work but has nevertheless succeeded in dealing with the literature as a whole in a comprehensive manner.

A second reviewer, Ronald Melville (of Kew Gardens), disagreed with Rao's phylogenetic and evolutionary conclusions but thought that many would be grateful to Venkata Rao "for bringing together in one volume such a detailed, comparative account of the vegetative and floral morphology and anatomy, the cytology and embryology, which will make it a valuable work of reference for a long time to come."

Within the Proteaceae, he authored the tribes, Macadamieae and Lambertieae (basionym of Lambertiinae) (both now subsumed into the Grevilleoideae). He also worked on other families, in particular, the Sterculiaceae, Malvaceae and Bombacaceae (now subsumed in an enlarged Malvaceae), and also Euphorbiaceae, Elaeocarpaceae and Apocynaceae.

His work centred on plant anatomy, morphology and embryology and also involved other families.

The standard author abbreviation Venk.Rao is used to indicate this person as the author when citing a botanical name.
