= Barbara G. Briggs =

Australian botanist

Barbara Gillian Briggs AM PSM
- Born: 1934 (age 91–92)
- Education: University of Sydney Ph.D. 1961
- Awards: Clarke Medal, Public Service Medal, Member of the Order of Australia
- Scientific career
- Fields: Botany
- Institutions: Sydney Botanical Gardens
- Thesis: Studies in the experimental taxonomy of Ranunculus and Darwinia.
- Author abbrev. (botany): B.G.Briggs

Barbara Gillian Briggs AM PSM (born 1934) is one of the foremost Australian botanists. The IK lists 205 names of plants which have been published or co-published by her. She was one of the botanists in the Angiosperm Phylogeny Group, of the 1998 APG system.

Briggs was employed at the Royal Botanic Garden, Sydney from 1959. She was awarded a PhD from the University of Sydney in 1960.

Briggs and Craig Anthony Atkins were co-awarded the Clarke Medal of the Royal Society of New South Wales in 1994.

Briggs was awarded the Public Service Medal in 1998. She was made a Member of the Order of Australia in the 2018 Queen's Birthday Honours for "significant service to science and research as a botanist, to documenting Australian flora, and to professional societies". She is a Fellow of the Royal Society of New South Wales (FRSN).

Since her retirement she continues as an Honorary Research Associate at the Sydney Botanical Gardens.

The plant, Lomandra briggsiana, was named in her honour.
