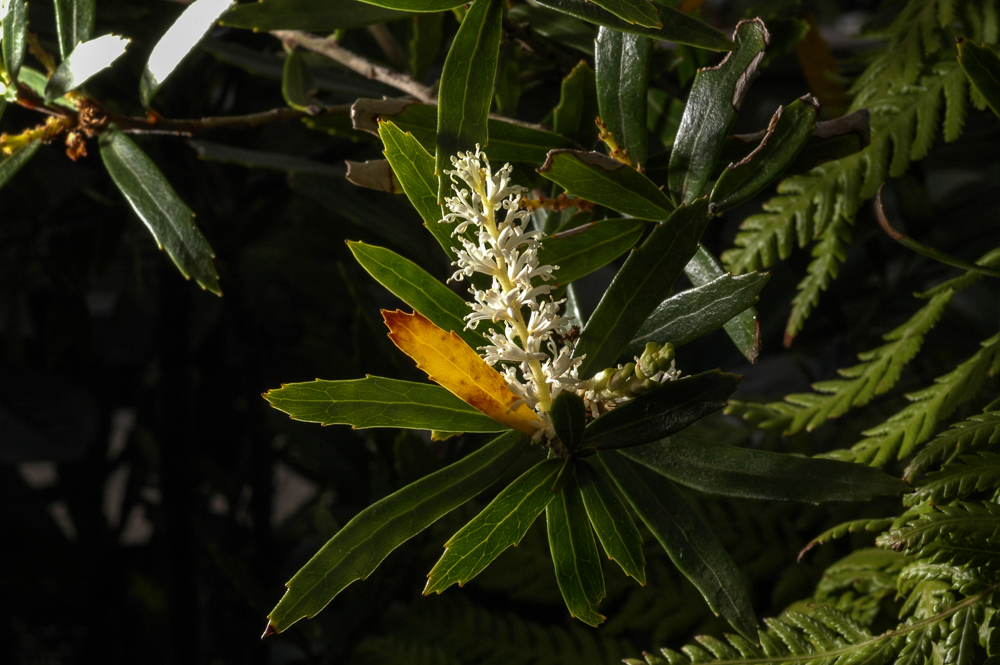
- Inflorescence

Scientific classification
- Kingdom: Plantae
- Clade: Tracheophytes
- Clade: Angiosperms
- Clade: Eudicots
- Order: Proteales
- Family: Proteaceae
- Genus: Orites
- Species: O. diversifolia

Binomial name
- Orites diversifolia R.Br.

Synonyms
- Orites diversifolius

= Orites diversifolia =

Species of flowering plant

Orites diversifolia (=diversifolius), commonly known as variable orites, is a member of the family Proteaceae and is endemic to Tasmania. The common name stems from the variable form of the leaves, which range from entire and linear to serrated and ovate. It is a common shrub in lowland rainforest, subalpine woodland and scrub.

== Taxonomy ==
Orites is a genus of the family Proteaceae and is one of twelve Tasmanian genera. Within the genus there are nine species, of which seven are Australian endemics. The remaining two species are South American, located in Bolivia and the Chilean Andes respectively. Four Australian endemics, Orites acicularis, Orites diversifolia, Orites milliganii and Orites revolutus, are also endemic to Tasmania. Orites diversifolia was discovered by the Scottish botanist Robert Brown in 1804 and the name was published by the Linnean Society of London in 1810. The name was derived from the Greek word "oreites," which translates to “mountaineer,” as the species was discovered on Tasmanian mountains. The species name "diversifolia" was likely chosen due to the variable nature of the leaves.

== Description ==
Orites diversifolia is an erect, rigid, branching shrub to 3m tall which occasionally establishes as a small tree in good conditions. Branches are brown and hairy. The leaves are stiff, leathery and alternate along the stems. Both the upper and lower surfaces are glabrous, with the upper surface a shiny green and the lower surface pale and glaucous. Leaf shape is linear but variable, frequently with serrated edges. Leaf margins are recurved and appear almost flat. Size of the leaf varies significantly with habitat, with subalpine individuals having smaller leaves that are 3–5 cm long, while rainforest leaves are commonly around 10 cm long.

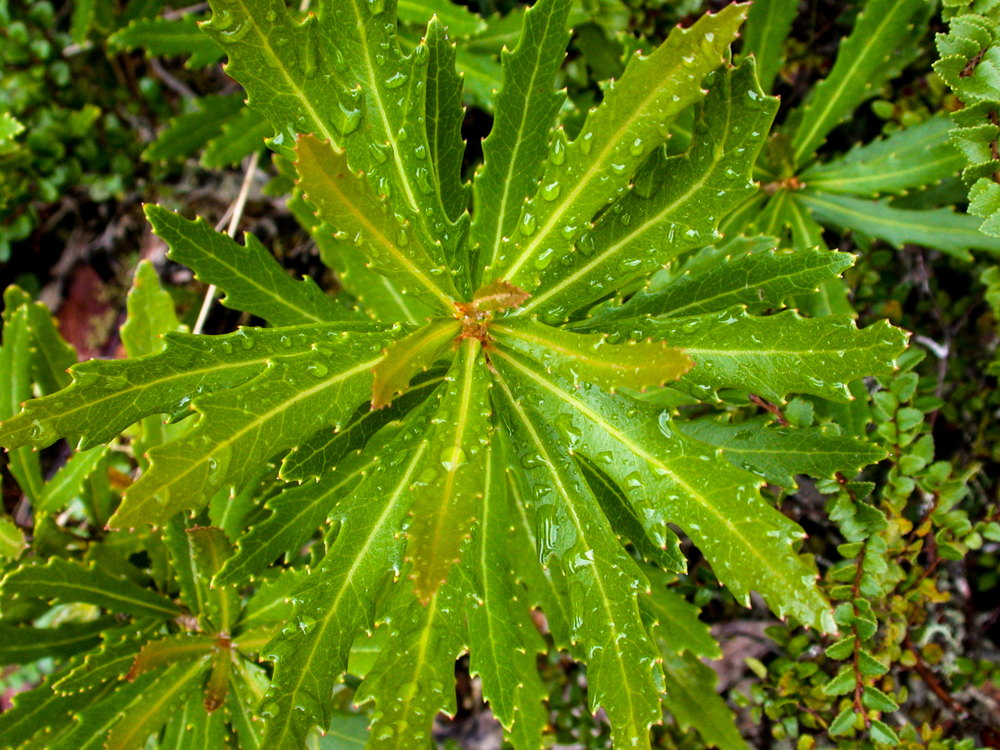
Orites diversifolia foliage

The inflorescences are axillary spikes on the upper end of branches which carry approximately twenty flowers on each spike. Flowers are small and very characteristic of the family Proteaceae. They are also sessile and paired in the axils of bracts. Flowers are made up of four petaloid tepals (petals and sepals, the perianth, are indistinguishable) which are cream in colour and 4-5mm long. Tepals are linear, less than 1mm in width and are recurved. Each flower has four stamens which rise above the tepals and a superior ovary. Flowers of Orites diversifolia are also sweetly scented. The fruit is a dark brown and moderately woody follicle that splits on one side to release seed. The boat-shaped follicles are located on branch ends in small clusters and are 18-24mm long and 6-8mm wide. Follicles contain two or more seeds which are winged and flattened.

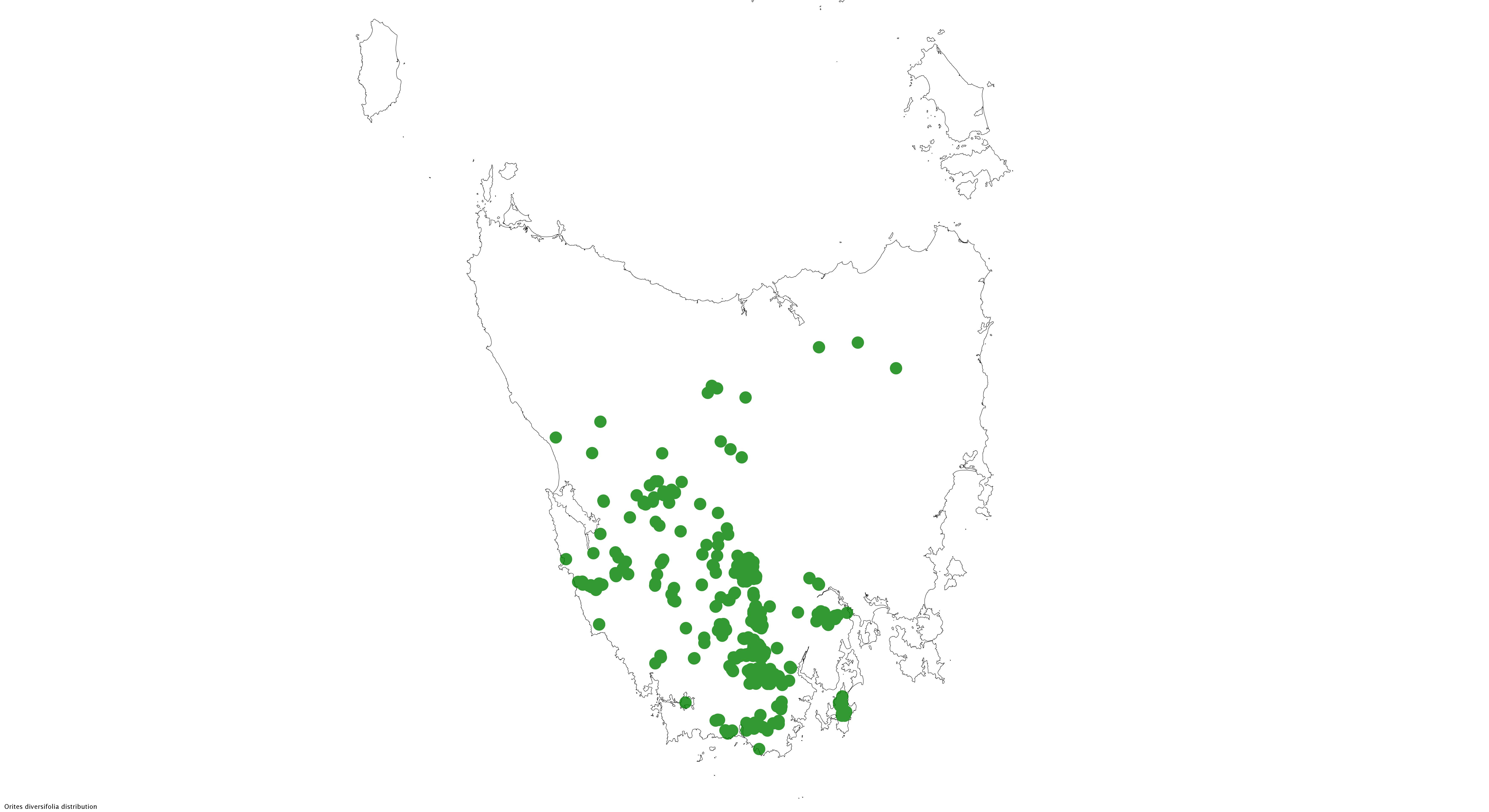
Distribution of Orites diversifolia, Tasmania, Australia Map from Atlas of Living Australia

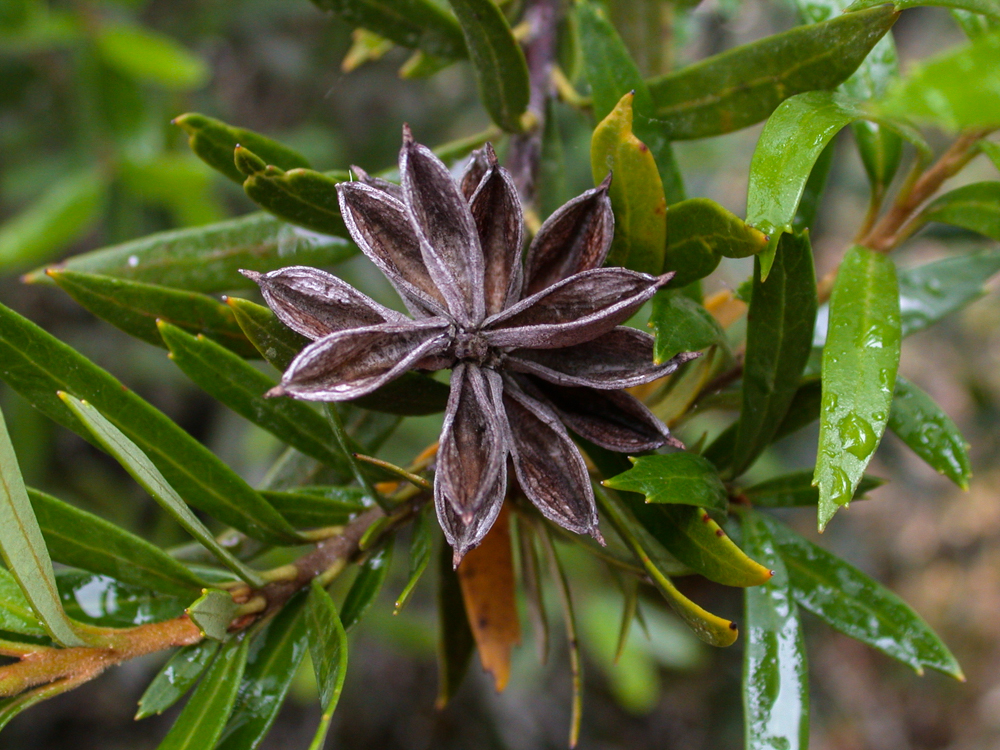
Orites diversifolia follicles

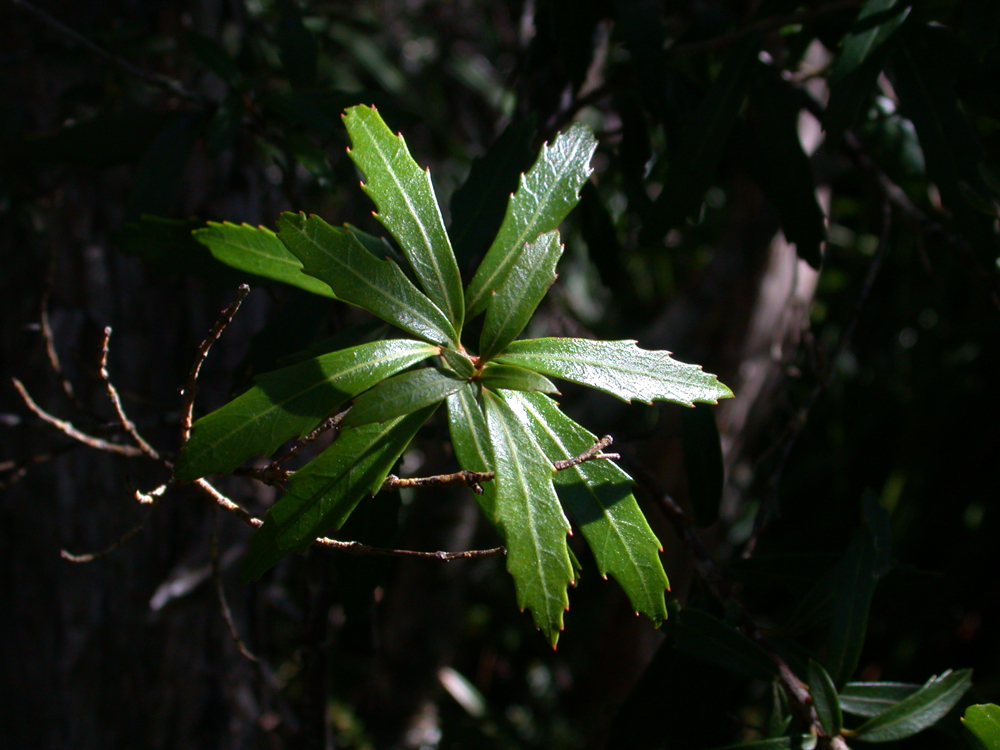
Orites diversifolia

== Habitat and distribution ==
Orites diversifolia is endemic to Tasmania. It is found in lowland rainforest and mixed forest across western Tasmania and in subalpine woodlands and coniferous heath in the south-west to 1300m. Orites diversifolia is common on the subalpine slopes of Mount Wellington and spreads through much of Mount Field National Park and the Southwest National Park. It is also found in the south of Bruny Island and around Mt Darwin in the Franklin-Gordon Wild Rivers National Park.

== Ecology ==
Cool, moist and shady sites are preferred by this species, however Orites diversifolia can tolerate higher light exposure in the subalpine zone by reducing leaf and overall size. It is both frost and snow tolerant. Orites diversifolia is present in multiple floristic communities which often contain dominant and co-dominant species such as Atherosperma moschatum, Phyllocladus aspleniifolius, Nothofagus spp., Eucryphia spp. and Leptospermum spp.

Orites diversifolia flowers in spring between the months of October and November. Seed is shed from December to February as soon as follicles ripen and dehisce. The seeds of Orites diversifolia have one large terminal wing, suggesting their mode of dispersal is via wind.

== Cytology ==
Orites diversifolia has a diploid chromosome number of 2n=28, which is consistent with all other species in the tribe Oriteae (includes genus Orites and Neorites), substantiating its taxonomic placement.

== Evolution ==
The family Proteaceae are well represented in the fossil record due to the leaves having a high resistance to decay and subsequently many have been discovered in Tasmania. It has been suggested that the current distribution of Orites came about through Gondwanan vicariance and fossil evidence dates the arrival in Australia to the early Oligocene. Despite this, vicariance can never be confirmed and evidence of long distance dispersal to contradict the theory may arise in the future. Macrofossils of an extinct close relative of Orites diversifolia from the Early-Middle Pleistocene known as Orites truncata G.J.Jord. as well as macrofossils of all other extant endemic Tasmanian Orites species were documented in Jordan 1995. This suggests that Orites diversifolia evolved sometime after this period.
