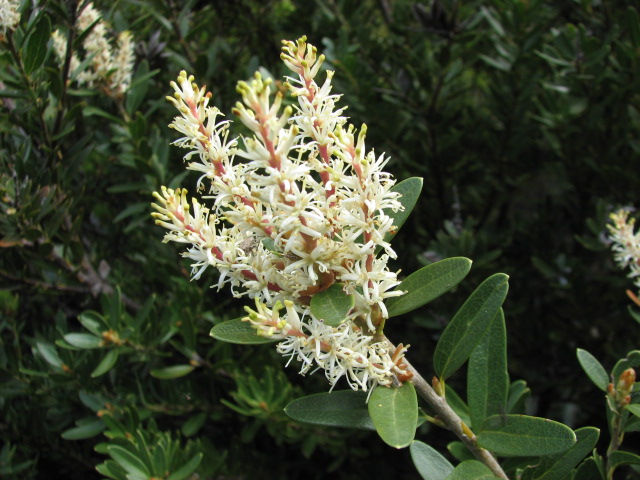
- Orites lancifolius

Scientific classification
- Kingdom: Plantae
- Clade: Tracheophytes
- Clade: Angiosperms
- Clade: Eudicots
- Order: Proteales
- Family: Proteaceae
- Subfamily: Grevilleoideae
- Tribe: Roupaleae
- Subtribe: Roupalinae
- Genus: Orites; R.Br.

Synonyms
- Oritina R.Br.

= Orites =

Genus of flowering plants

Orites is a genus of nine plant species in the family Proteaceae. Seven species are endemic to Australia (three on the mainland and four in Tasmania), and the other two are from South America (one endemic to the Chilean Andes and the other to Bolivia).

== Species ==
This listing was sourced from the Australian Plant Name Index and other scholarly sources:

- Orites acicularis (R.Br.) Roem. & Schult., Yellow bush – Tasmania, Australia
- Orites diversifolia R.Br., Variable orites – Tasmania, Australia
- Orites excelsus R.Br., Mountain silky oak, prickly ash, white beefwood, southern silky oak, siky oak – NSW and Qld, Australia
- Orites fiebrigii – Bolivia
- Orites lancifolius F.Muell., Alpine orites – NSW, ACT and Victoria, Australia
- Orites milliganii Meisn., Toothed orites – Tasmania, Australia
- Orites myrtoidea – Chile
- Orites revolutus R.Br. – Tasmania, Australia

Formerly included here:

- Orites sp. Devils Thumb − now Hollandaea diabolica
- Orites megacarpus − now Nothorites megacarpus
