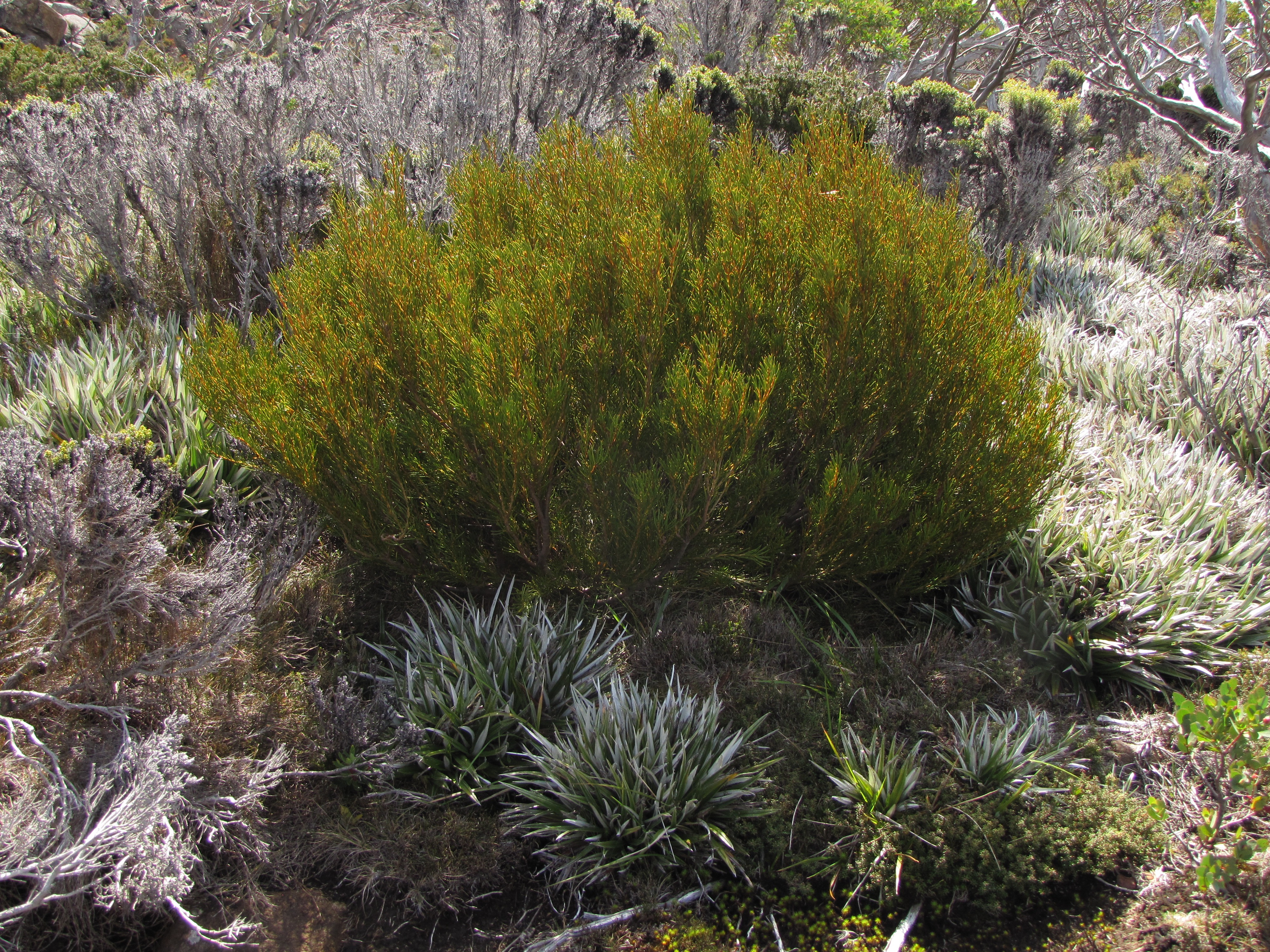
- Orites acicularis in sub-alpine habitat on Mount Wellington, Tasmania

Scientific classification
- Kingdom: Plantae
- Clade: Tracheophytes
- Clade: Angiosperms
- Clade: Eudicots
- Order: Proteales
- Family: Proteaceae
- Genus: Orites
- Species: O. acicularis

Binomial name
- Orites acicularis (R.Br.) Roem. & Schult.

Synonyms
- Oritina acicularis R.Br.

= Orites acicularis =

Species of plant endemic to Tasmania, Australia

Orites acicularis, commonly known as yellow bush, is an angiosperm endemic to Tasmania, Australia and is a member of the genus Orites within the family Proteaceae. The species was first described in 1810 by Scottish botanist Robert Brown in Transactions of the Linnean Society of London.

== Description ==
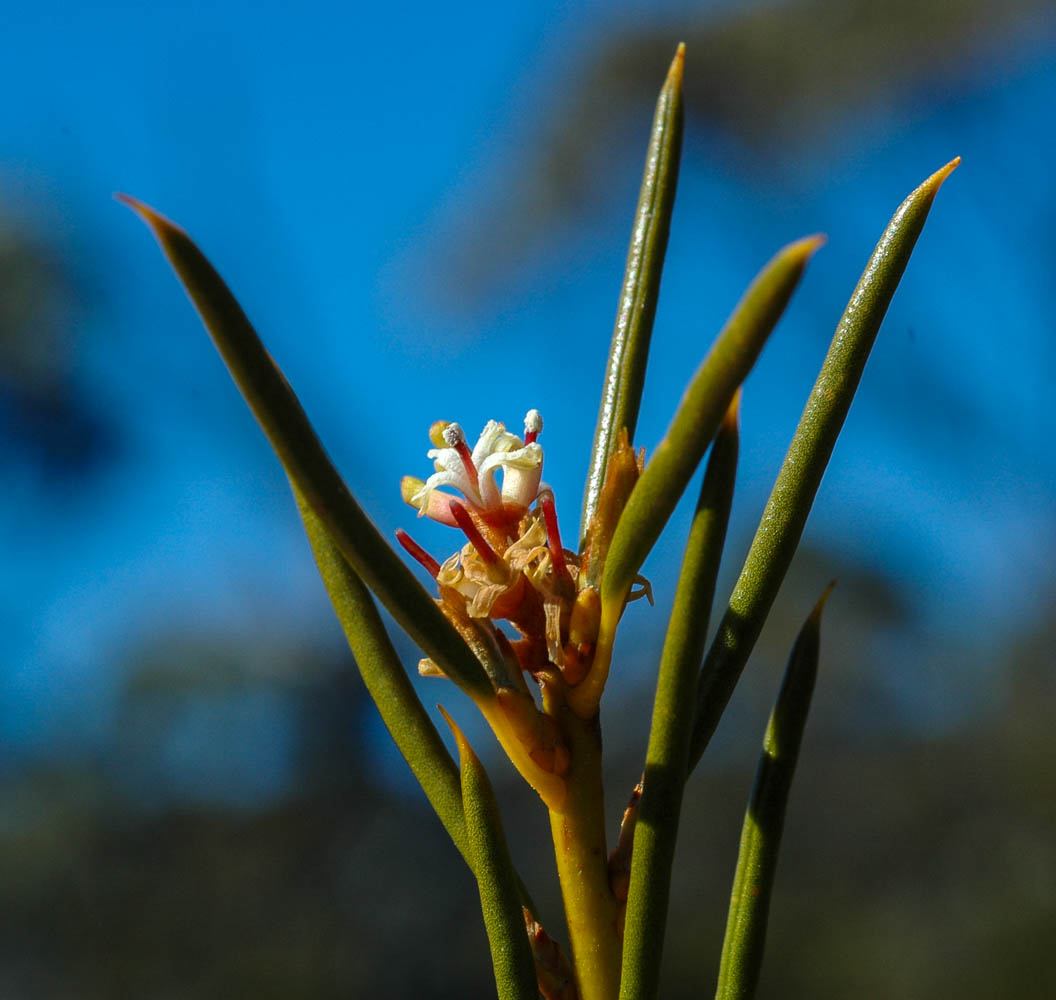
Flowers

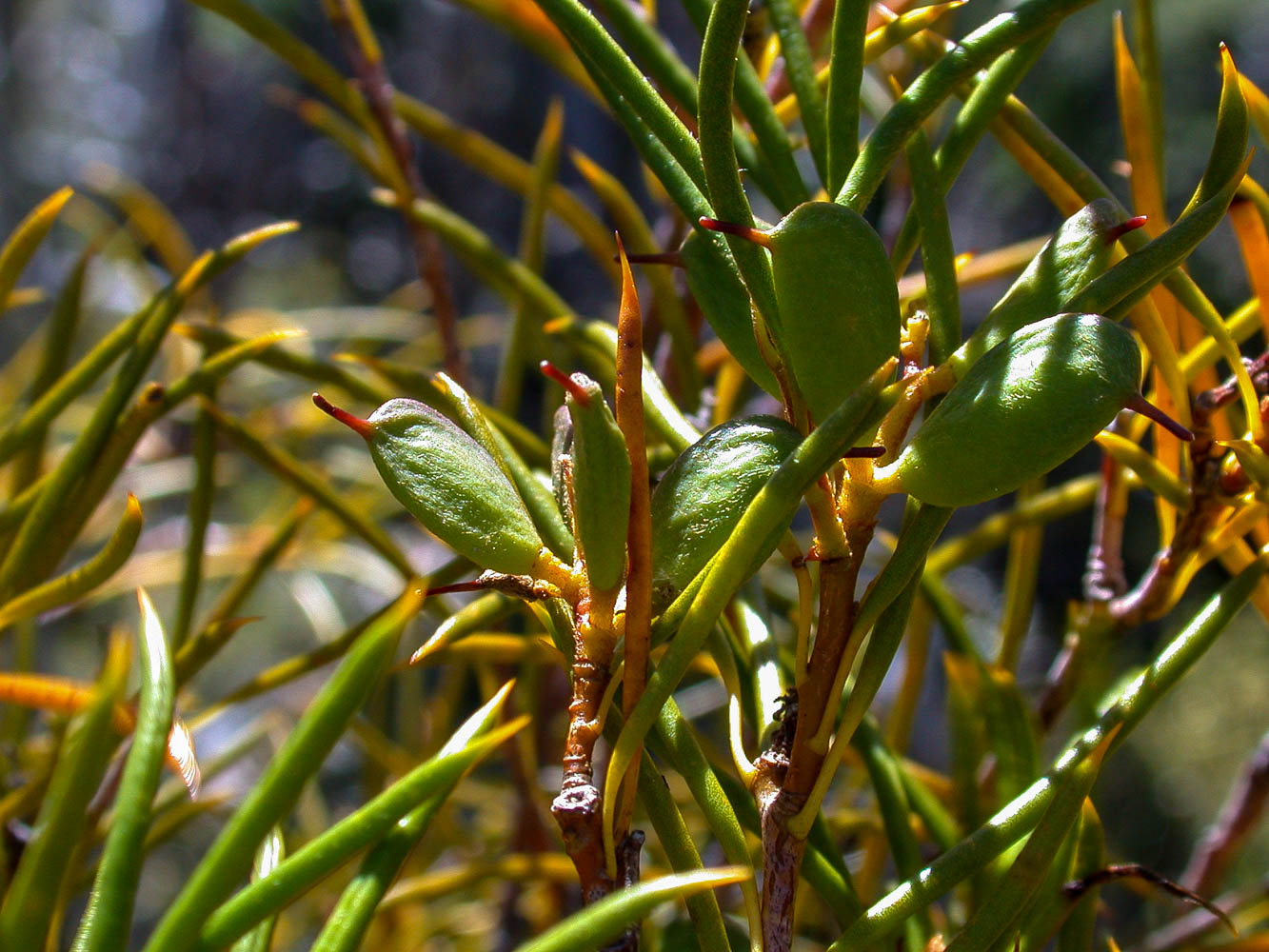
Immature fruit

Orites acicularis is a yellow-green coloured, woody, rounded shrub growing to approximately 1–1.5 m (3.28–4.92 ft) in height and 0.5–1 m (1.64–3.28 ft) in width, with many ascending branches.

The leaves are of a conspicuous yellow-green colour; they are glabrous, sclerophyllous, approximately 10–35 mm (0.4–1.4 in) long, and rounded. They taper to a sharp point, which is typically more yellow than the rest of the leaf. The adaxial surface of the leaf has a shallow central groove, and the leaf margins are entire. Leaves attach to the woody stem by a 2–5 mm petiole.

Flowering occurs in December, and presents upon a rachis which can be terminal or axillary. The perianth is homochlamydeous; it comprises four white-cream tepals with a groove running along the centre, and curling under to display the pink style. The immature fruit is a green similar to that of the leaves. The fruits are glabrous and oblong, with an elongated tip of reddish brown. When mature, the follicle is lignified and erect, approximately 15 mm long, and boat-shaped. The boat shape is due to the seeds having been released immediately upon maturity.

== Habitat and distribution ==
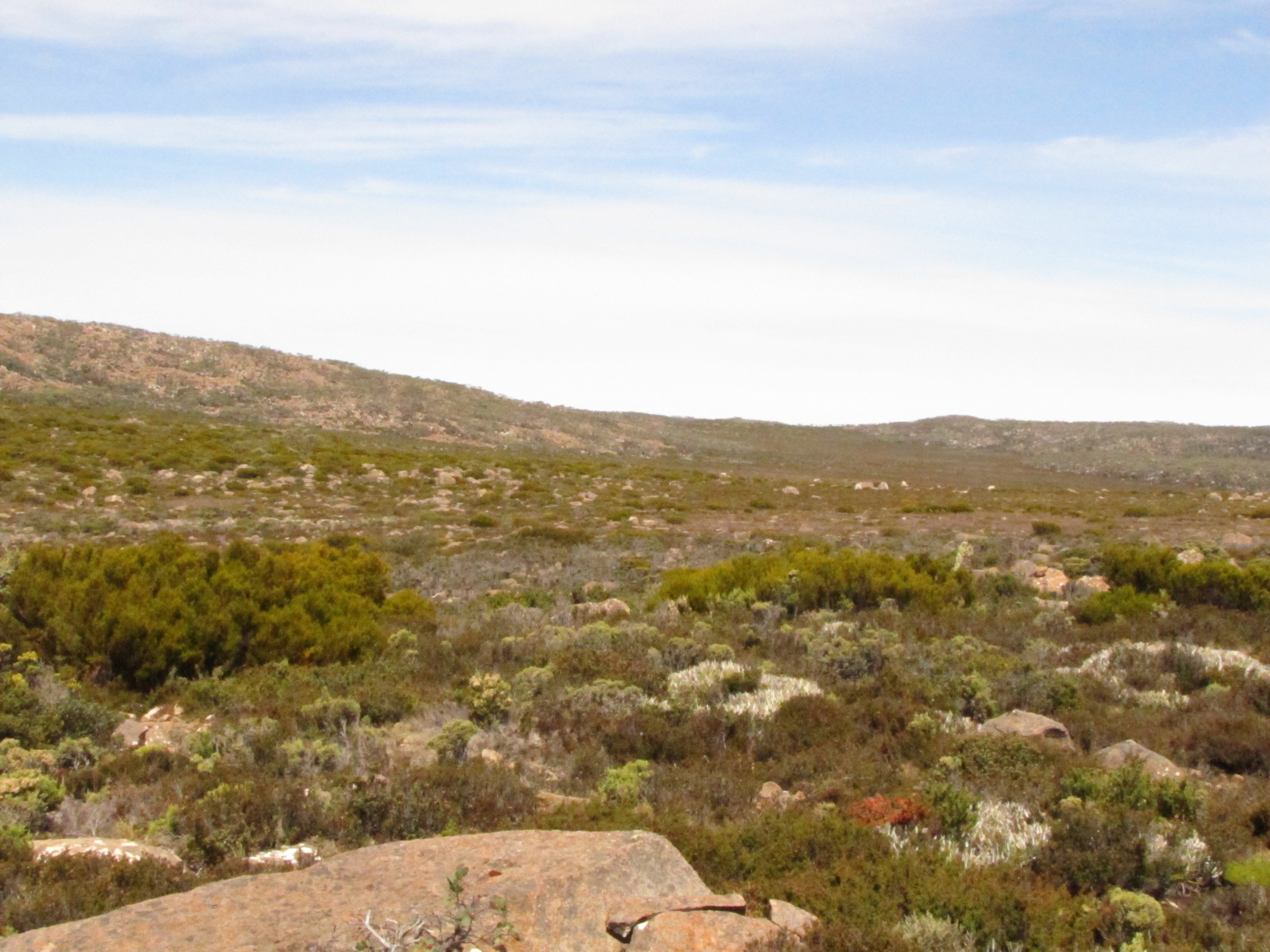
O. acicularis in sub-alpine plateau habitat on Mount Wellington, Tasmania

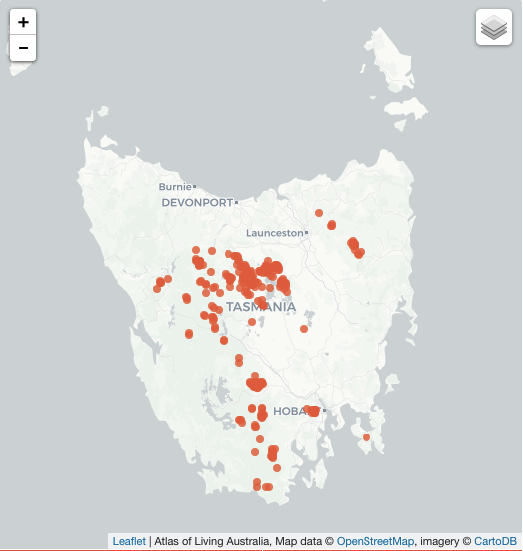
Distribution map for Tasmania

Orites acicularis commonly occurs in Tasmanian sub-alpine mountain plateaus, heaths, and boulder fields with a geology of dolerite, granite, and diorite. Dolerite's slow rate of erosion results in shallow, low-nutrient soils with an abundance of rock fragments. In sub-alpine plateaus, depressions form in the boulder fields. There, vegetable and mineral matter accumulate, creating bogs or smaller areas of deep soil. Similarly, bolster heath impedes drainage, creating shallow peats.

Other species of plants that commonly grow in this habitat include: Gleichenia alpina, Astelia alpina, Baeckea gunniana, Bauera rubioides, Orites revoluta, Richea sprengelioides, Tasmannia lanceolata, and Eucalyptus coccifera.

== Adaptations to solar radiation ==
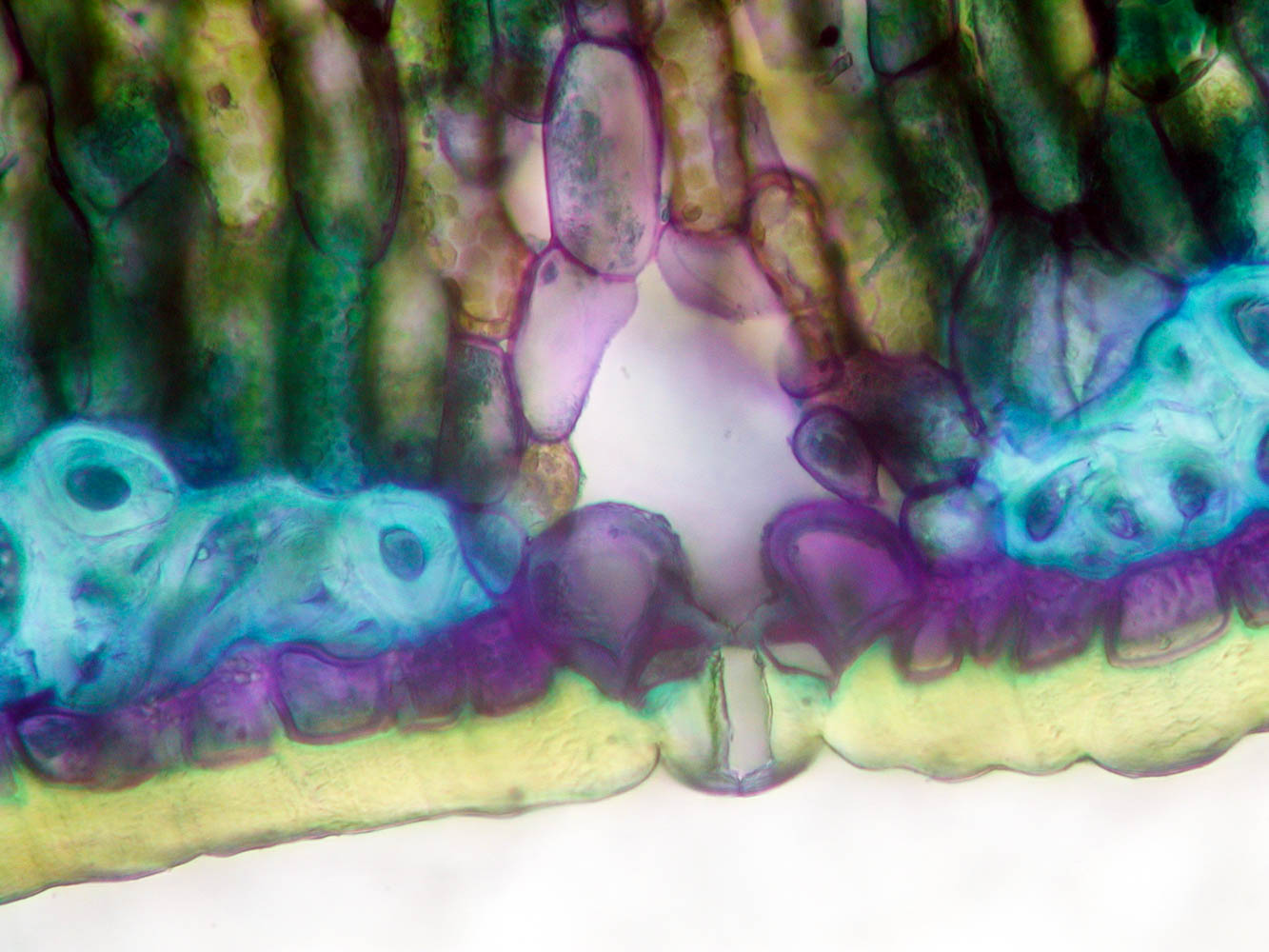
Transverse section of leaf showing Orites-type abaxial pseudohypodermis (stained blue)

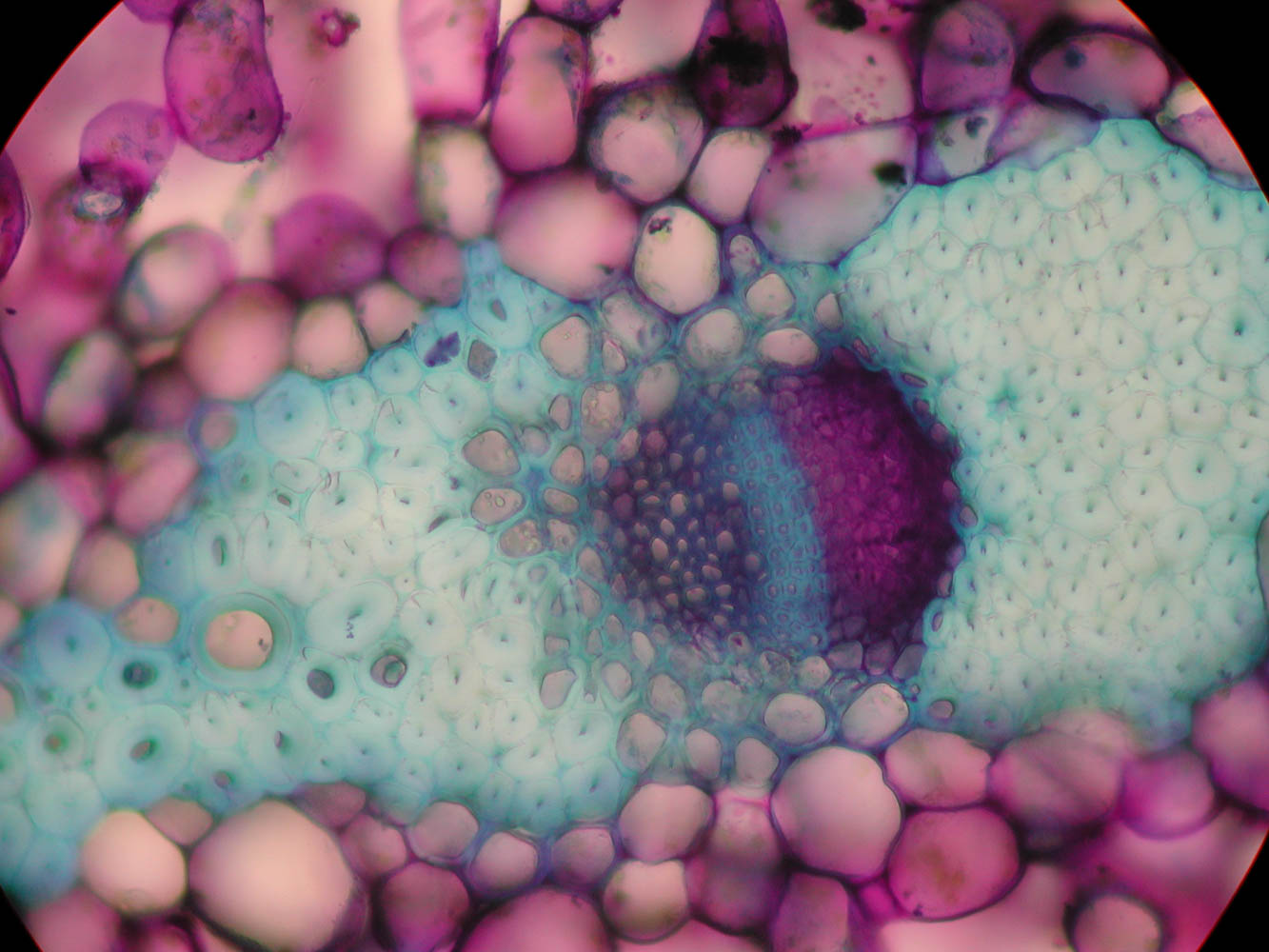
Transverse section of leaf showing the bundle sheath extension

Orites acicularis has evolved a number of characteristics to assist with protection from solar radiation in excess of its photosynthetic requirements. Two such adaptations are its abaxial pseudohypodermis and its bundle sheath extensions.

Bundle sheath extensions are formed when sclerenchyma and/or collenchyma cells around a bundle sheath extend to both the adaxial and abaxial epidermis layers of a leaf. The evolution of these bundle sheath extensions in species restricted to open vegetation in the family Proteaceae suggests that it is a recurring adaptation to provide protection against the high levels of solar radiation present. The Orites-type abaxial pseudohypodermis is defined as multiseriate, elongate sclerids forming a reticulum around the sub-stomatal cavities (Jordan et al. 2005) and acts as a further barrier to solar radiation that lies just below the cuticle of the plant.

== Etymology ==
The specific epithet, acicularis, is derived from Latin and means "needle-shaped".
