= Orites milliganii =

Scientific classification
- Kingdom: Plantae
- Clade: Tracheophytes
- Clade: Angiosperms
- Clade: Eudicots
- Order: Proteales
- Family: Proteaceae
- Genus: Orites
- Species: O. milliganii

Binomial name
- Orites milliganii Meisn., 1856

Species of plant endemic to Tasmania, Australia

Orites milliganii, also known as Milligan's orites or the toothed orites, is a species of flowering plant in the protea family that is endemic to Tasmania, Australia.

== Description ==
The species grows as a dense and rigid shrub up to 2 metres (6 ft 7 in) in height, or more in sheltered sites. The thick, oval leaves are 15–30 mm (0.6–1.2 in) long, with short stalks, toothed margins and sharp, pointed tips. The cream-coloured, scented flowers are clustered on spikes at the ends of the branches. The dry fruits are about 15 mm 15 mm (0.6 in) long, splitting open along one side to release the seeds.

== Distribution and habitat ==
The species has a restricted distribution in the mountains of western Tasmania, where it is a component of alpine deciduous and coniferous heathland. It is considered to be rare under Tasmania's Threatened Species Protection Act 1995.
