= Hollandaea =

Scientific classification
- Kingdom: Plantae
- Clade: Embryophytes
- Clade: Tracheophytes
- Clade: Spermatophytes
- Clade: Angiosperms
- Clade: Eudicots
- Order: Proteales
- Family: Proteaceae
- Subfamily: Grevilleoideae
- Tribe: Roupaleae
- Subtribe: Heliciinae
- Genus: Hollandaea; F.Muell.

Type species
- Hollandaea sayeri (F.Muell.) F.Muell. – a nomenclatural synonym of: Hollandaea sayeriana (F.Muell.) L.S.Sm.

Species
- See text

Genus of plants endemic to Queensland, Australia

Hollandaea is a small genus of plants in the family Proteaceae containing four species of Australian rainforest trees. All four species are endemic to restricted areas of the Wet Tropics of northeast Queensland.

== Naming and classification ==
The genus was formally described in an 1887 publication by German–Australian botanist Ferdinand von Mueller, who named it in honour of Sir Henry Holland, Secretary of State for the Colonies from 1888 to 1892.

Lawrie Johnson and Barbara G. Briggs noted the unusual fruits and placed genus in its own subtribe Hollandaeinae within the tribe Helicieae in the subfamily Grevilleoideae in their 1975 monograph "On the Proteaceae: the evolution and classification of a southern family". Molecular genetic analysis shows Hollandaea correlates most closely with the genus Helicia and the two are classified in the subtribe Heliciinae within the tribe Roupaleae.

== Species ==
- Hollandaea diabolica A.J.Ford & P.H.Weston
- Hollandaea porphyrocarpa A.J.Ford & P.H.Weston
- Hollandaea riparia B.Hyland
- Hollandaea sayeriana (F.Muell.) L.S.Sm.

Synonyms: base name: Helicia sayeriana F.Muell.; Hollandaea sayeri (F.Muell.) F.Muell.

== Natural distributions ==
Hollandaea sayeriana is a species of small trees growing naturally only in the region of Mounts Bellenden Ker, Bartle Frere and the eastern Atherton Tableland. They grow naturally as understory trees beneath the canopy of rainforests, from the lowlands to tablelands, up to about 800 m (2,600 ft) altitude. As of December 2013 this species has the official, current, Queensland Government conservation status of "near threatened" species.

Hollandaea riparia is a species of shrubs and small trees named for growing naturally only in riparian and gallery forest as a rheophyte (river streamside plant). Botanists have found it only in a restricted natural range in the Daintree Rainforest region. As of December 2013 this species has the official, current, Queensland government conservation status of "vulnerable" species.

The species Hollandaea diabolica and Hollandaea porphyrocarpa were both recognised by botanical science only as recently as the 1990s and formally scientifically described in 2012. Around the early 1990s both were recognised only in a restricted area in the mountains west and north west of Mossman, Queensland. A population of H. diabolica affinity was subsequently found south of Mount Bellenden Ker but collections were only of sterile material and not yet fertile and fruiting material. Both species may only grow naturally in the restricted mountains areas reported and further field work will clarify this.
