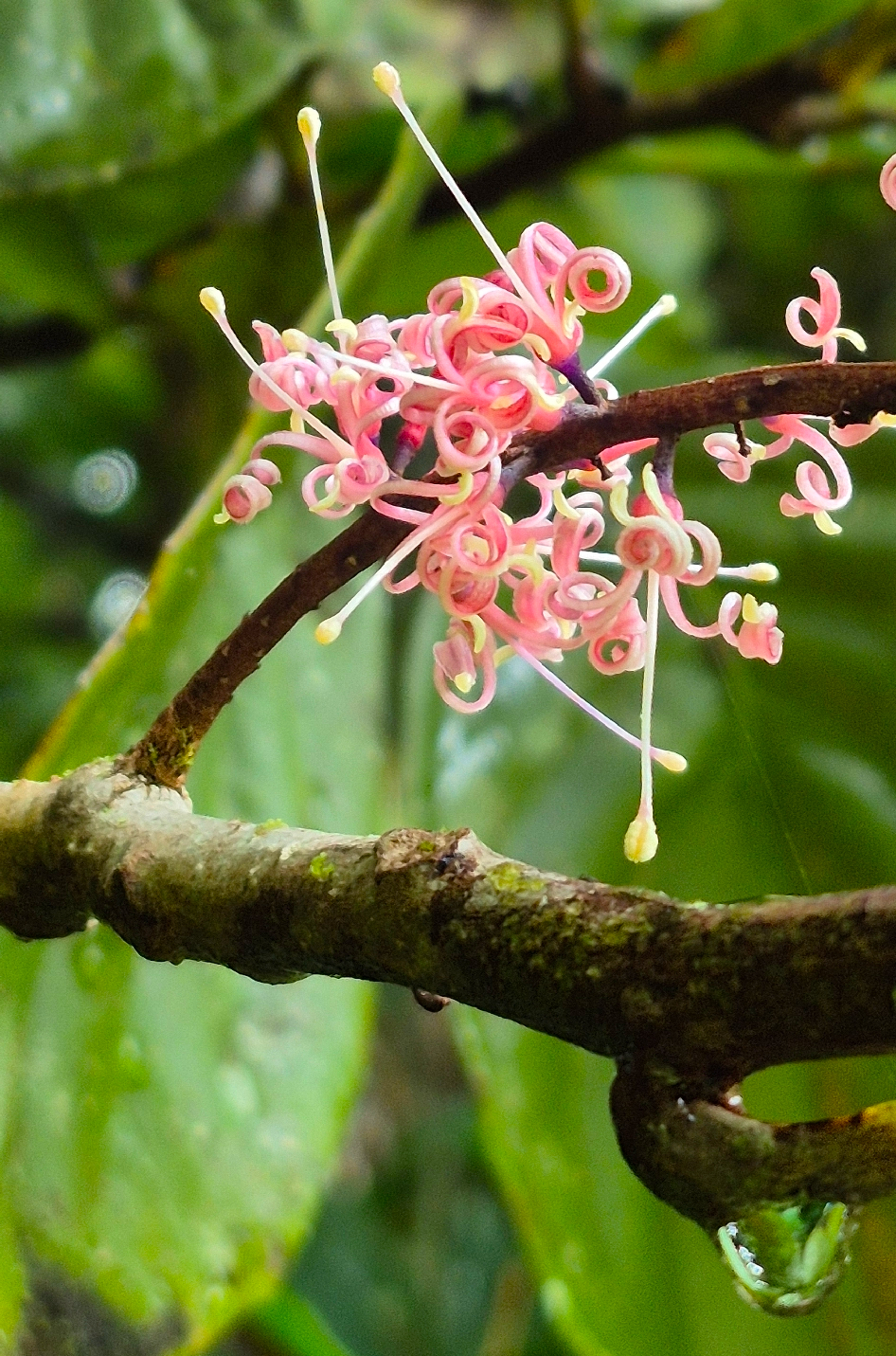
- Flowering on Mount Bellenden Ker

Conservation status
- Endangered (IUCN 3.1)
- Least Concern (NCA)

Scientific classification
- Kingdom: Plantae
- Clade: Embryophytes
- Clade: Tracheophytes
- Clade: Spermatophytes
- Clade: Angiosperms
- Clade: Eudicots
- Order: Proteales
- Family: Proteaceae
- Genus: Hollandaea
- Species: H. sayeriana

Binomial name
- Hollandaea sayeriana (F.Muell.) L.S.Sm.

Synonyms
- Helicia sayeriana F.Muell.; Hollandaea sayeri F.Muell.

= Hollandaea sayeriana =

Species of flowering plant

Hollandaea sayeriana, also known as Sayer's silky oak, is a species of plant in the macadamia family Proteaceae. It is native to northeast Queensland, Australia, and is considered to be an endangered species by the International Union for Conservation of Nature (IUCN).

== Description ==
Hollandaea sayeriana is a single-stemmed tree growing to about 17 m (56 ft) tall. The trunk has nondescript bark, is usually less than 30 cm (12 in) diameter and does not produce buttresses. The leaves are arranged alternately on the twigs and are attached to them by a petiole that is short and swollen. The leaf blades are ovate to almost orbicular and can reach up to 22 cm (8.7 in) long and 14 cm (5.5 in) wide. They are dull green on both sides, the lower side lighter than the top, and they have between six and eleven lateral veins on either side of the midrib.

The flowers are borne on conflorescences which grow from the branches below the leaves. The conflorescences are between 20 and 40 cm (7.9 and 15.7 in) long and carry between 90 and 220 individual flowers. The tepals are pink in colour, 2 to 3 cm (0.8 to 1.2 in) long, and tightly coiled after the flower opens; the style is pink and up to 2 cm (0.8 in) long.

The fruit is the character that sets Hollandea apart from other Proteaceae, being a follicle with non-winged seeds. It is somewhat sausage-shaped or cylindrical, about 10 cm (4 in) long, and it has a single rib on one side. It contains up to 20 angular seeds.

== Distribution and habitat ==
The species is endemic to restricted areas of the Wet Tropics region of northeastern Queensland, occurring from Mount Bellenden Ker and Mount Bartle Frere to about Innisfail and in eastern parts of the Atherton Tableland. It is a sub-canopy tree of rainforest with an altitudinal range from sea level to about 800 m (2,600 ft).

== Taxonomy ==
The plant material on which the first formal description of this species is based was collected close to the Russell River by botanical collector William A. Sayer in 1886. Botanist Ferdinand von Mueller wrote the description and published it in the journal The Victorian Naturalist in 1887 under the name Helicia sayeriana. However, the description was incomplete as there was no fruiting material collected. In June 1887, Mueller published an updated description after receiving fruiting branches from Sayer, and now recognising the "generic distinctness of this remarkable plant" he erected a new genus, renaming it Hollandaea sayeri. The changing of the species epithet from sayeriana to sayeri was unnecessary and deemed illegitimate under the rules governing the naming of plants, and in 1956, Australian botanist Lindsay Stuart Smith published a correction, giving the species its current name.

Within the Proteaceae family, Hollandaea is placed in the subfamily Grevilleoideae, tribe Roupaleae and subtribe Heliciinae.

== Etymology ==
The genus name Hollandaea was chosen in honour of Henry Holland, the then British Secretary of State for the Colonies. The species epithet sayeriana commemorates the original collector of the plant, William A. Sayer.

== Conservation status ==
in 2012, the time of publication of Ford and Weston's review of the genus Hollandaea, this species was listed as near threatened under Queensland's Nature Conservation Act, but as of 5 June 2026 that ranking has been downgraded to least concern. In contrast, the IUCN has assessed the species as endangered, citing a "continuing decline in area, extent and/or quality of habitat", poor recruitment (germination & survival of seed), and the presence of feral pigs and seasonal cyclones as threats to the species.

== Gallery ==
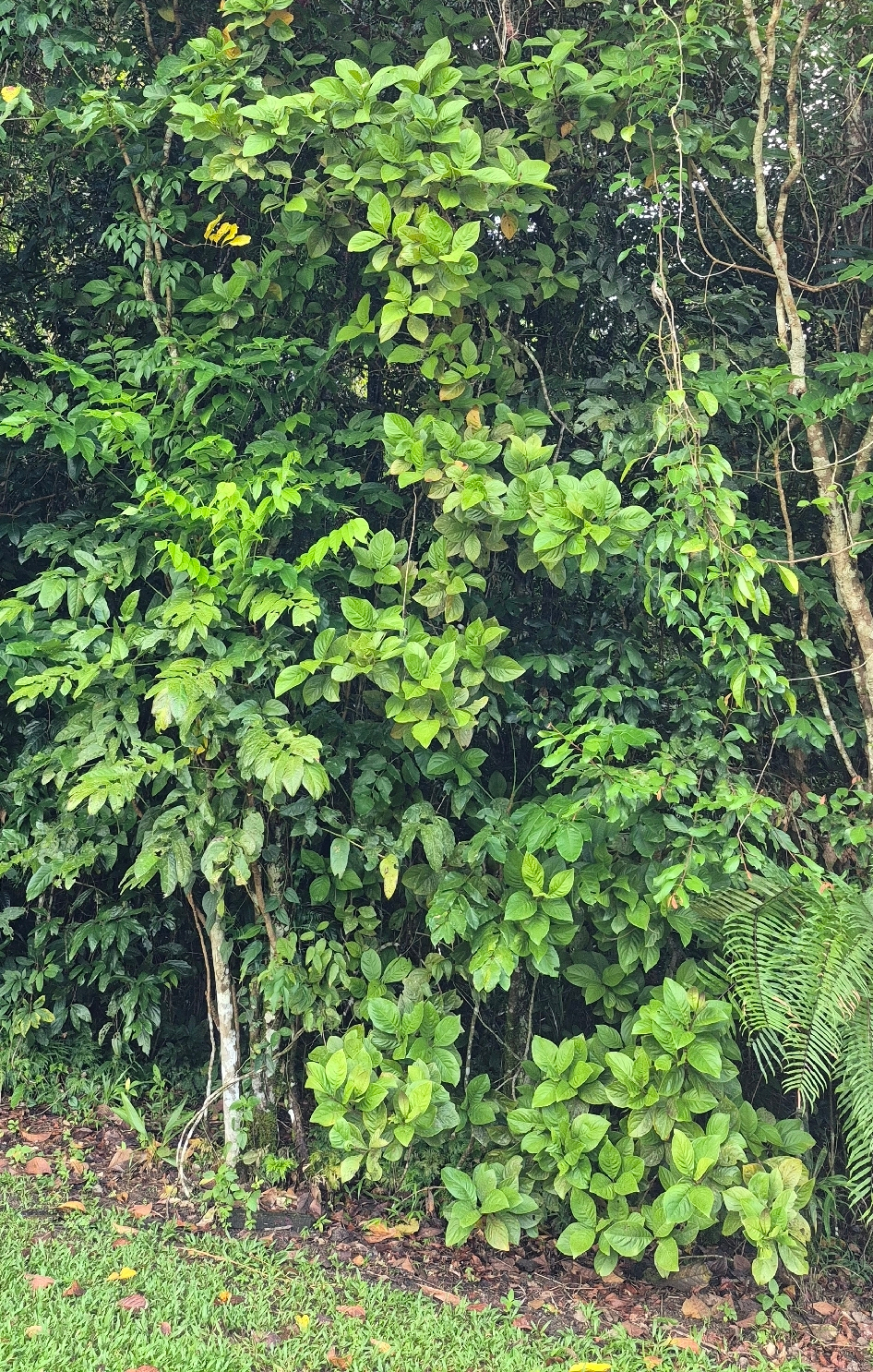
Habit

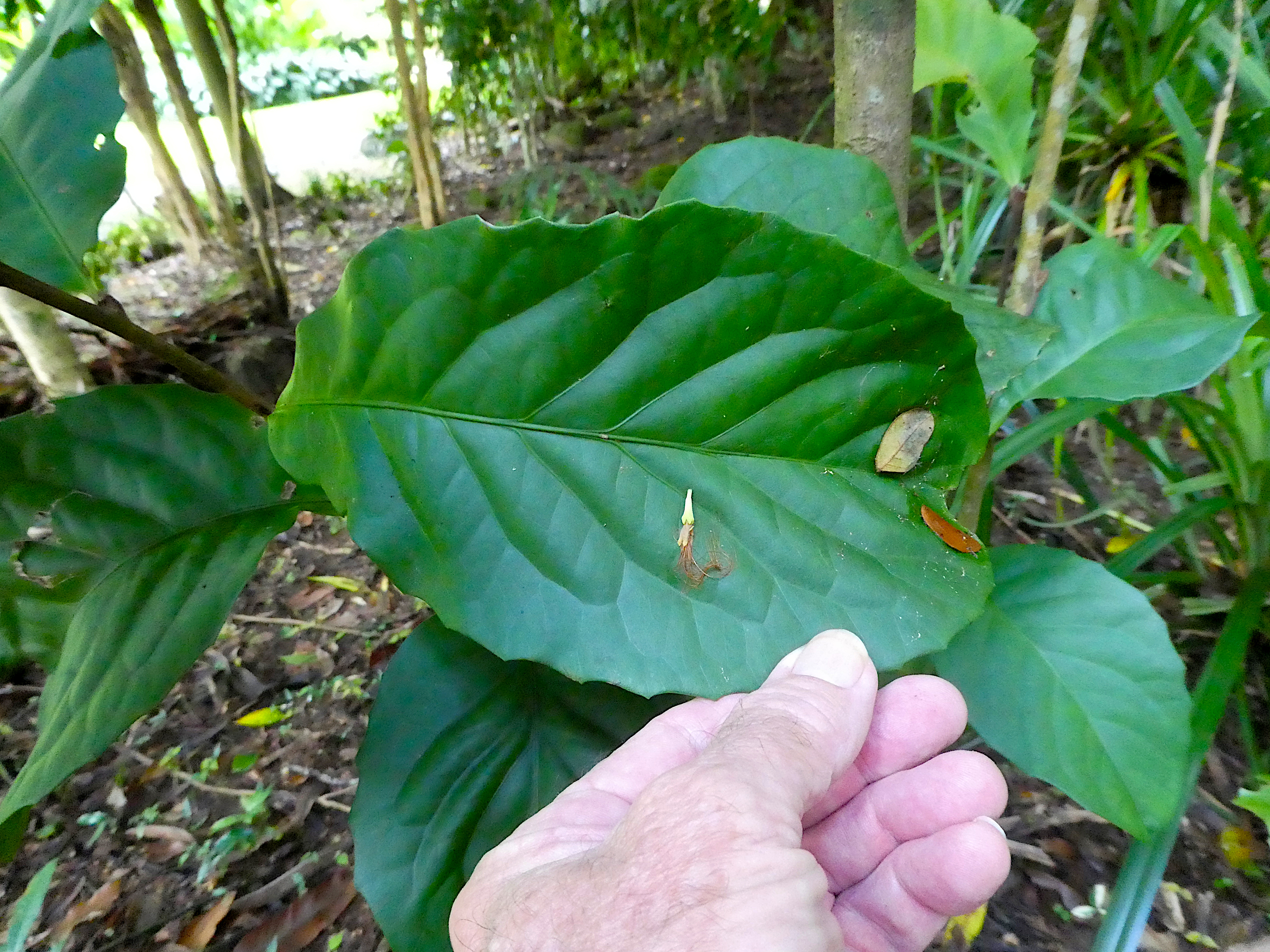
Leaf

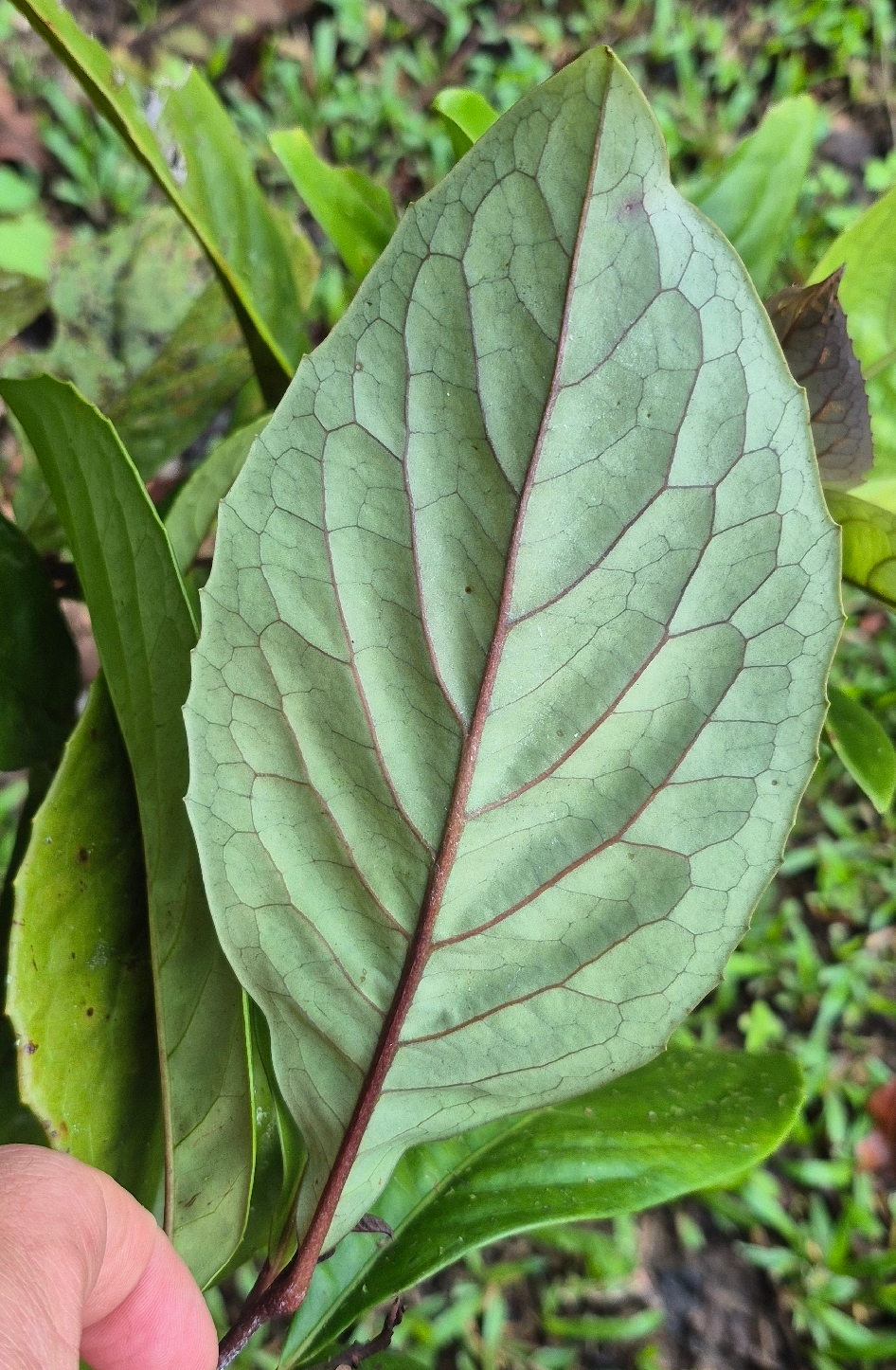
Underside

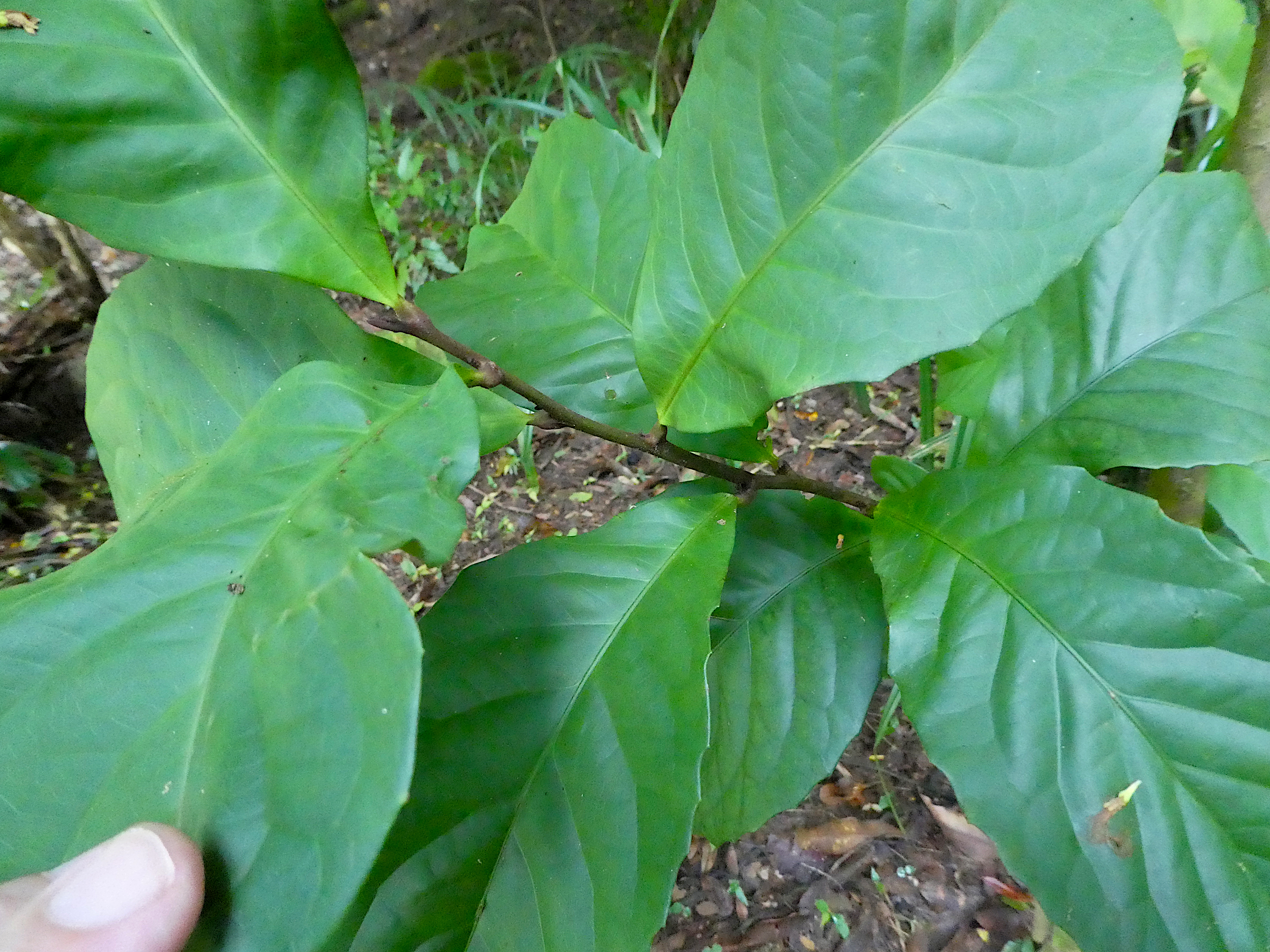
Arrangement & petioles

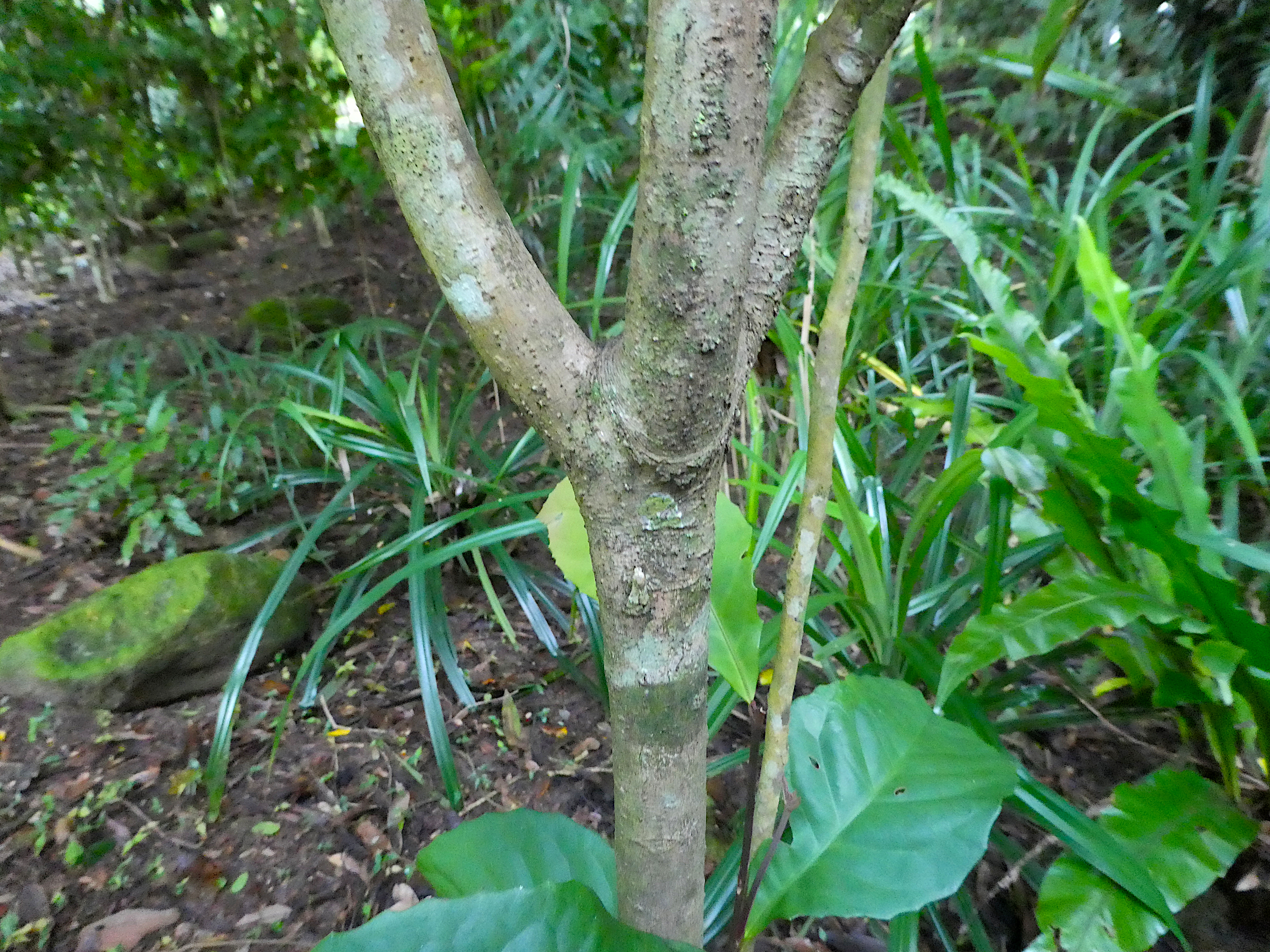
Trunk
