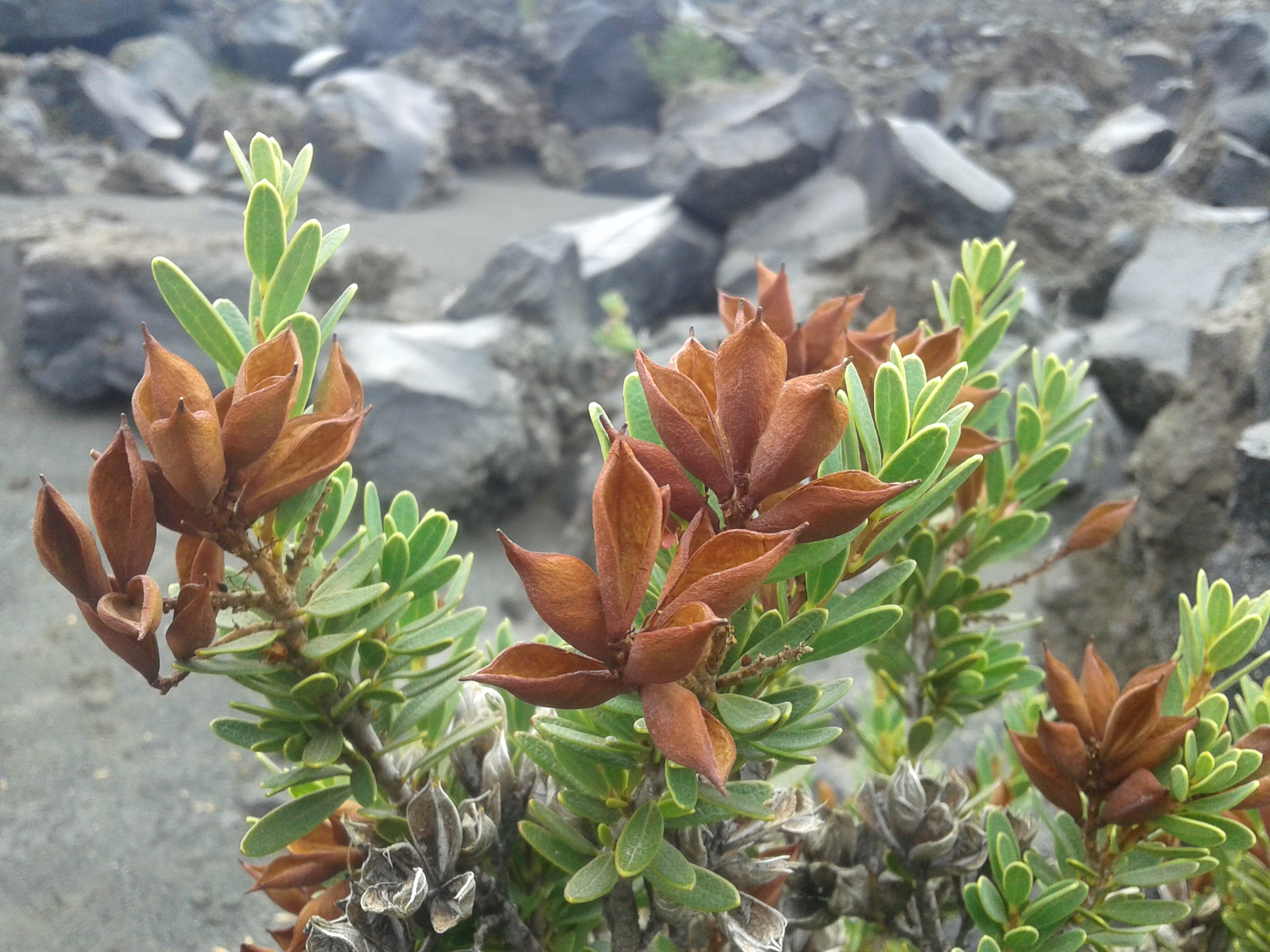
- Orites myrtoidea with open fruits in autumn

Scientific classification
- Kingdom: Plantae
- Clade: Tracheophytes
- Clade: Angiosperms
- Clade: Eudicots
- Order: Proteales
- Family: Proteaceae
- Genus: Orites
- Species: O. myrtoidea

Binomial name
- Orites myrtoidea (Poepp. & Endl.) Benth. & Hook.f. ex B.D.Jacks.

Synonyms
- Lomatia chilensis Gay; Roupala myrtoidea Poepp. & Endl.

= Orites myrtoidea =

Species of shrub native to the Andes in Chile

Orites myrtoidea, the radal enano, is a shrub species in the family Proteaceae. It is a rare plant which occurs in lava fields in the Andes in Chile. The species may grow up to 2 metres (6.6 ft) high, but more often is in the range of 0.5 to 1 metre (1.6 to 3.3 ft). The leaves are about 3 cm (1.2 in) long and 1 cm (0.4 in) wide. White to yellowish flowers appear in compact racemes between October and November (mid to late spring) in its native range. These are followed in autumn with reddish brown fruits containing winged seeds.
