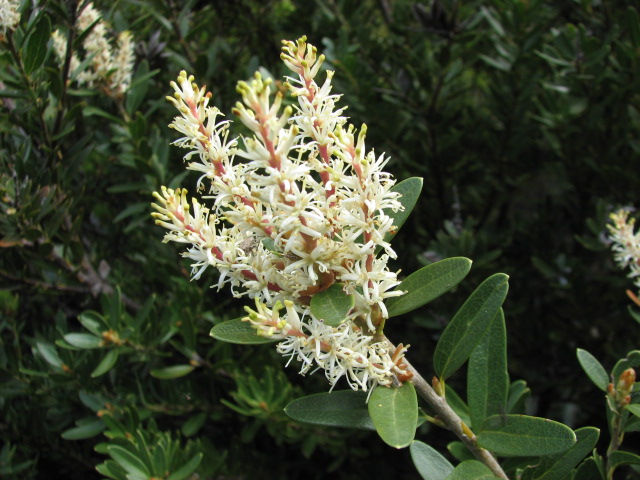
- Orites lancifolius in Baw Baw National Park

Scientific classification
- Kingdom: Plantae
- Clade: Tracheophytes
- Clade: Angiosperms
- Clade: Eudicots
- Order: Proteales
- Family: Proteaceae
- Genus: Orites
- Species: O. lancifolius

Binomial name
- Orites lancifolius F.Muell.

= Orites lancifolius =

Species of shrub endemic to Australia

Orites lancifolius, commonly known as alpine orites, is a shrub in the family Proteaceae. It is endemic to south-eastern Australia. The species has a spreading habit and may be a prostrate or up to 2 metres (6 ft 7 in) high. The leaves 1 to 3 cm (0.4 to 1.2 in) long, and 5 to 12 mm wide. White to pale yellow flowers appear between December and January (early to mid summer) in its native range. The species was first formally described in 1855 by botanist Ferdinand von Mueller from plant material that he collected "on the rocky summits of the Australian Alps (5-6000 feet high)".

Orites lancifolius occurs in alpine and subalpine areas of New South Wales, the Australian Capital Territory and Victoria in heath and tussock grassland amongst granite rocks.
