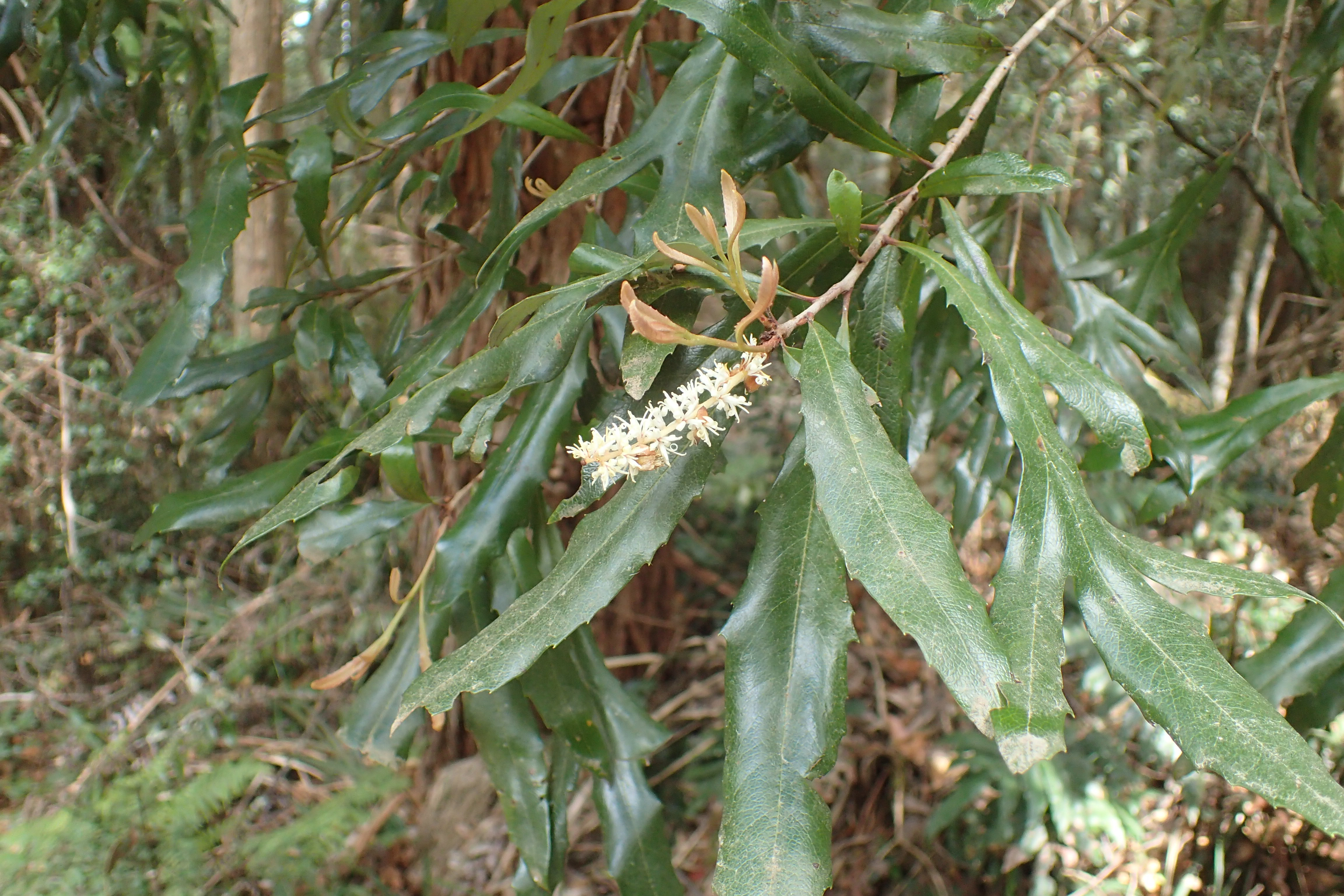
- Orites excelsus in the New England National Park

Scientific classification
- Kingdom: Plantae
- Clade: Tracheophytes
- Clade: Angiosperms
- Clade: Eudicots
- Order: Proteales
- Family: Proteaceae
- Genus: Orites
- Species: O. excelsus

Binomial name
- Orites excelsus R.Br.

Synonyms
- Orites excelsa R.Br. orth. var.; Orites excelsa R.Br. var. excelsa orth. var.; Orites excelsa var. fissifolia F.Muell. orth. var.; Orites excelsus R.Br. var. excelsus; Orites excelsus var. fissifolius F.Muell.; Orites fragrans F.M.Bailey isonym

= Orites excelsus =

Prickly ash

Species of tree endemic to Australia

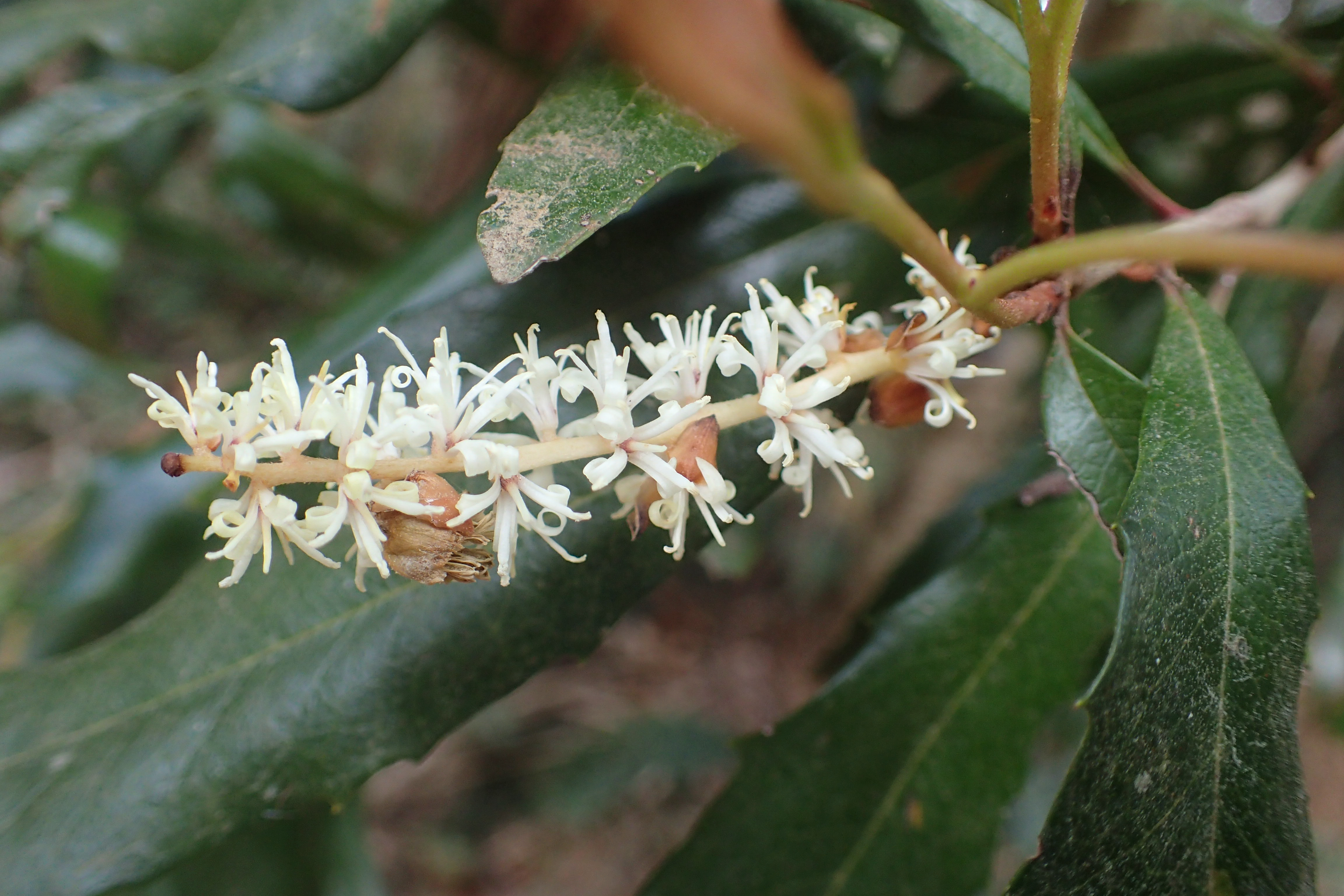
Flower detail

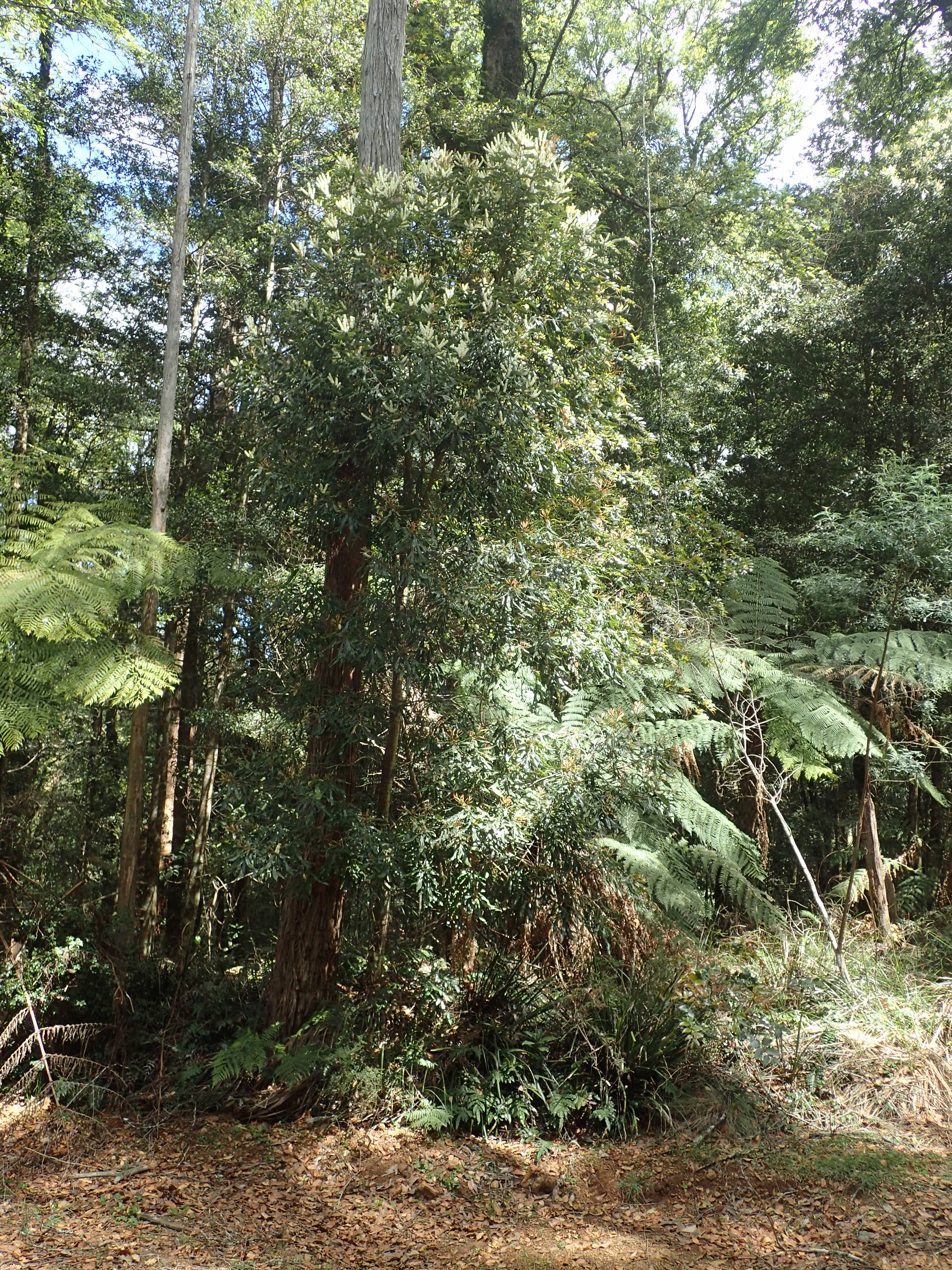
Habit

Orites excelsus, commonly known as prickly ash, mountain silky oak or white beefwood, is a species of flowering plant in the family Proteaceae and is endemic to eastern Australia. It is a medium-sized to tall rainforest tree with oblong to lance-shaped leaves, variously lobed and with teeth on the edges. The flowers are white and arranged in leaf axils in spikes that are shorter than the leaves.

== Description ==
Orites excelsus is a tree that typically grows to a height of up to 30 m (98 ft) with more or less smooth brown or grey bark, often with minute scales, and new shoots are covered with rust-coloured hairs at first. The leaves are elliptic, lance-shaped, egg-shaped or oblong, 40–185 mm (1.6–7.3 in) long and 15–45 mm (0.59–1.77 in) wide on a petiole 10–25 mm (0.39–0.98 in) long. They are usually lobed, usually have teeth regularly arranged along the edges, shiny green on the upper surface and grey to whitish below. The flowers are white or creamy-white, fragrant, about 6 mm (0.24 in) long and are arranged in leaf axils along a rachis 50–110 mm (2.0–4.3 in) long. Flowering occurs from winter to early spring and the follicles are boat-shaped, 20–30 mm (0.79–1.18 in) long and 8–10 mm (0.31–0.39 in) wide.

== Taxonomy ==
Orites excelsus was first formally described in 1830 by Robert Brown in Supplementum primum Prodromi florae Novae Hollandiae from specimens collected by Charles Fraser near the Hastings River in 1818.

Frederick Manson Bailey described Orites fragrans from Mounts Bellenden Ker and Bartle Frere, now accepted as an isonym of O. excelsus.

Fossils of lobed leaves closely resembling juvenile leaves of O. excelsus have been recovered from the early to middle Eocene Taratu Formation near Livingstone in northern Otago, New Zealand. They have been provisionally classified as close to this species, though a resemblance to Athertonia diversifolia has been noted.

== Distribution and habitat ==
Orites excelsus is found in cool mountain rainforests from Barrington Tops in New South Wales to Main Range National Park, south-west of Brisbane, Queensland, at altitudes above 750 m (2,460 ft). It also occurs on a number of mountains in Far North Queensland, including Mount Bellenden Ker and Mount Bartle Frere, from 1,000 to 1,500 m (3,300 to 4,900 ft). It is associated with yellow carabeen (Sloanea woollsii).

== Uses ==
The timber of prickly ash has been used for shingles, casks, furniture and joinery.
