= Orites fiebrigii =

Scientific classification
- Kingdom: Plantae
- Clade: Tracheophytes
- Clade: Angiosperms
- Clade: Eudicots
- Order: Proteales
- Family: Proteaceae
- Genus: Orites
- Species: O. fiebrigii

Binomial name
- Orites fiebrigii (Perkins) Diels ex Sleumer, 1954

Synonyms
- Roupala fiebrigii Perkins, 1911

Species of plant endemic to Bolivia

Orites fiebrigii is a species of flowering plant in the protea family that is endemic to Bolivia.
