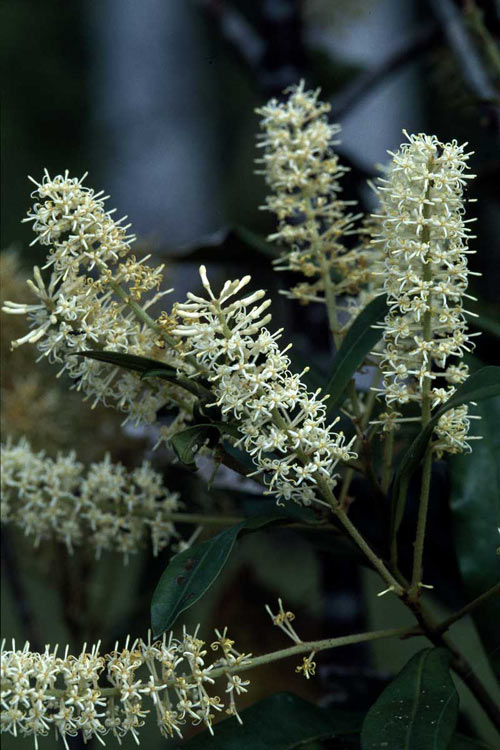
- Inflorescence

Conservation status
- Endangered (IUCN 3.1)
- Least Concern (NCA)

Scientific classification
- Kingdom: Plantae
- Clade: Tracheophytes
- Clade: Angiosperms
- Clade: Eudicots
- Order: Proteales
- Family: Proteaceae
- Subfamily: Grevilleoideae
- Tribe: Macadamieae
- Subtribe: Macadamiinae
- Genus: Nothorites; P.H.Weston & A.R.Mast
- Species: N. megacarpus

Binomial name
- Nothorites megacarpus (A.S.George & B.Hyland) P.H.Weston & A.R.Mast

Synonyms
- Orites megacarpa A.S.George & B.Hyland

= Nothorites =

Monotypic genus of plants native to Australia

Nothorites is a monotypic genus in the macadamia family Proteaceae. The sole species, Nothorites megacarpus, is endemic to the wet tropics rain forests of northeastern Queensland, Australia.

== Description ==
Nothorites megacarpus is a tree growing up to 25 m (82 ft) tall, with a light brown lenticellate bark. The simple leaves have smooth margins and are arranged alternately on the twigs. They are dark glossy green and measure up to 10 cm (3.9 in) long by 3 cm (1.2 in) wide, and are held on a thickened petiole about 1.2 cm (0.5 in) long.

The inflorescences are panicles produced either terminally or in the leaf axils. The cream coloured, pedicellate flowers are in pairs but do not share a peduncle. The perianth is about 6 mm (0.24 in) long and the entire flower is finely hairy.

The fruit is a green or brown follicle which dehisces at maturity and contains 2 flat seeds, each with a narrow marginal wing. The fruit measure up to 4 cm (1.6 in) long by 2 cm (0.8 in) wide.

=== Phenology ===
Flowering occurs from November to March, while fruit ripen from October to January.

== Taxonomy ==
The species was first formally described by the Australian botanists Alex George and Bernard Hyland, based on plant material collected from Mount Bartle Frere in 1986. They gave it the name Orites megacarpa and their work was published in 1995 in volume 16 of the book series Flora of Australia. Later, detailed genetic studies of the tribe Macadamieae conducted by Austin Mast and colleagues demonstrated that O. megacarpa was more closely related to the South American genus Panopsis than it was to the genus Orites, resulting in the transfer of this species to the new genus Nothorites in 2008.

=== Etymology ===
The genus name Nothorites is a combination of the Ancient Greek νόθος (nóthos), meaning bastard, illegitimate, or spurious; combined with the name of the genus that this plant was originally placed in, i.e. Orites. It points to the unsuitable taxonomic placement the plant was initially given. The species epithet megacarpus comes from the prefix mega- (great, large) and the suffix -carp (fruit).

== Distribution and habitat ==
The range of this species is restricted to two small refugia, one in Mount Lewis National Park north of Cairns, and the other on Mount Bartle Frere south of Cairns. The habitat is microphyll vine forest on granitic soils, at altitudes above 1,000 m (3,300 ft). The species has a very small area of occupancy of just 40 km^{2} (15 sq mi). (Note: For a definition of Area of Occupancy see this page at the Atlas of Living Australia)

== Conservation ==
This species has been rated as least concern by Queensland's Department of Environment and Science, however the International Union for Conservation of Nature (IUCN) has given the species a classification of endangered. In their summary, the IUCN gives the reason for this assessment as declining habitat due to climate change, combined with a very small area of occupancy.

== Gallery ==
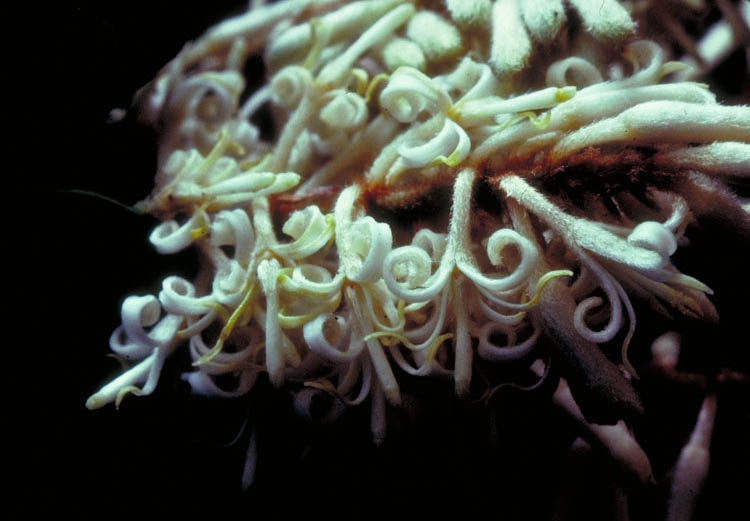
Close up of flowers

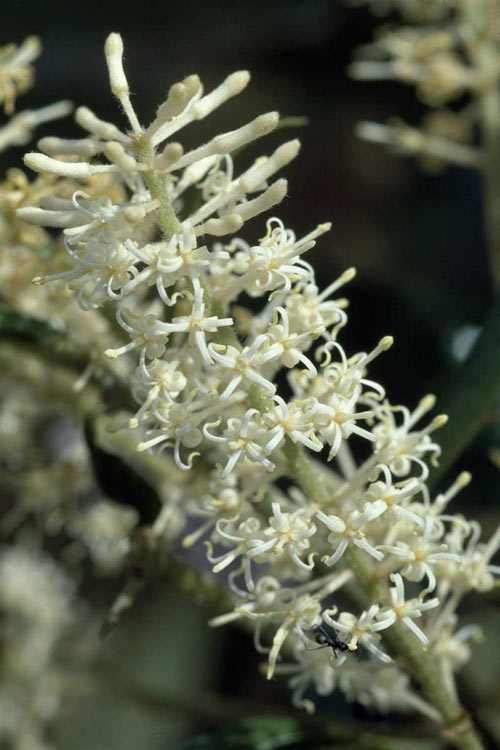
Inflorescence

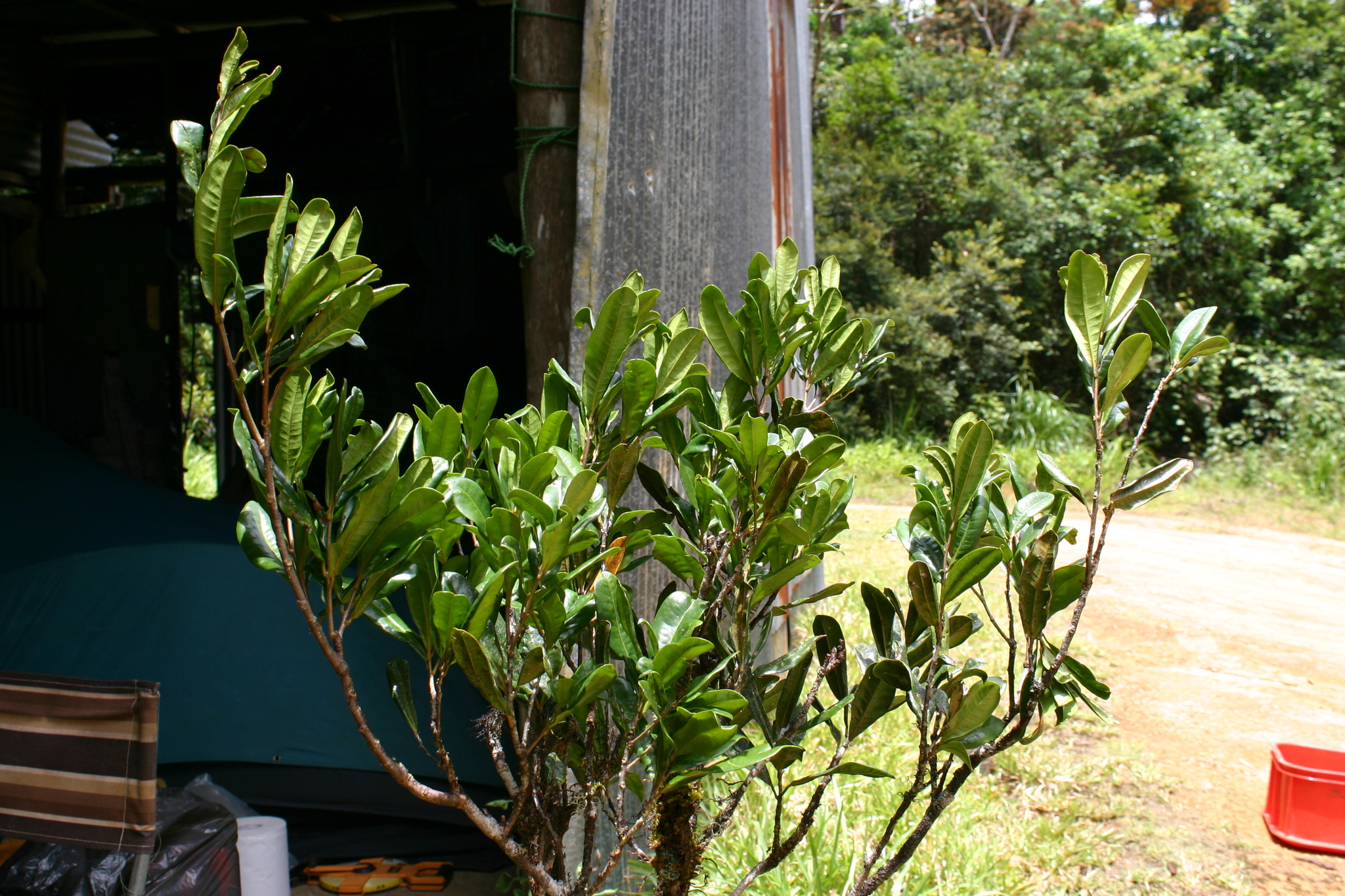
Small tree

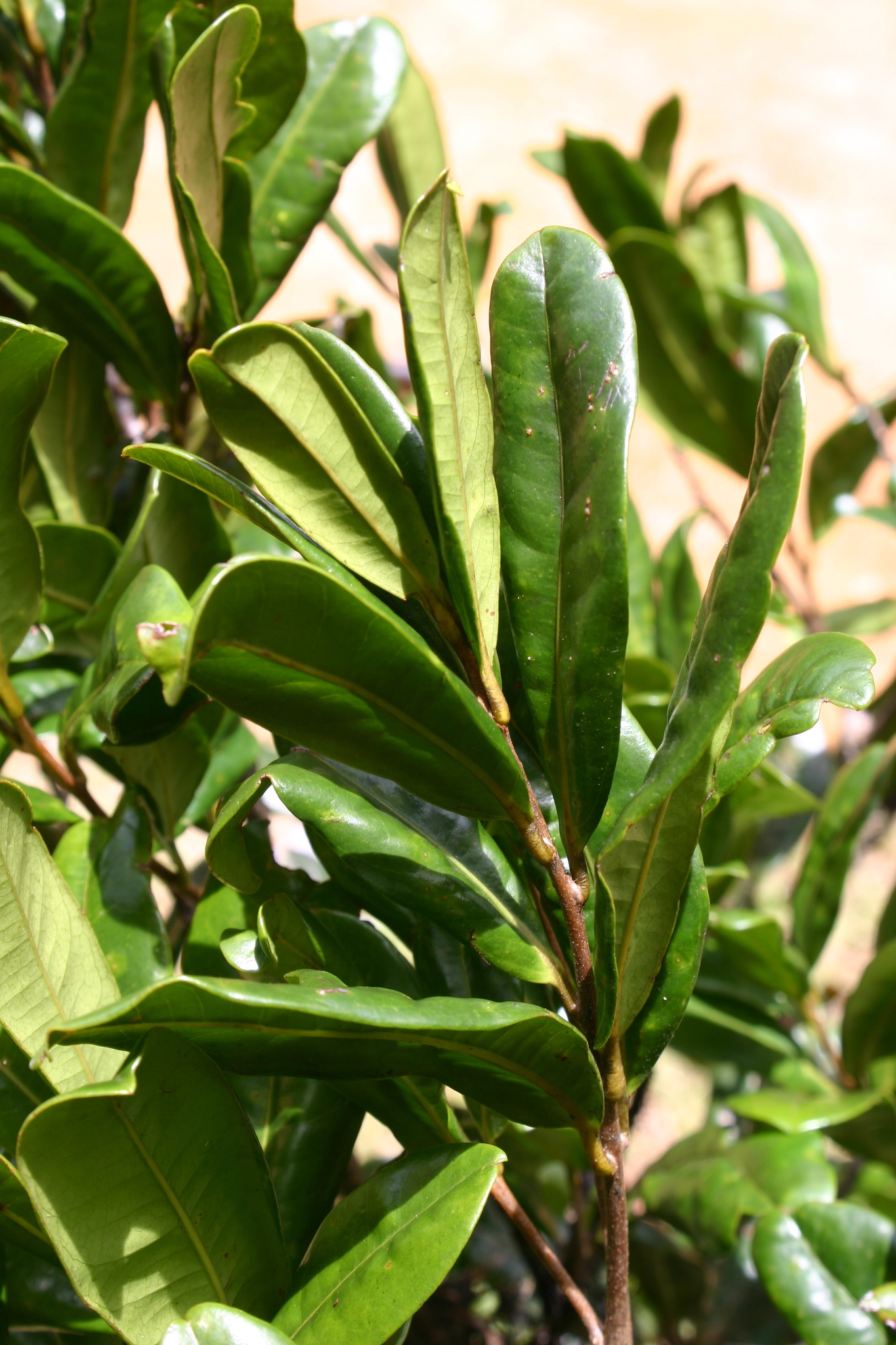
Foliage

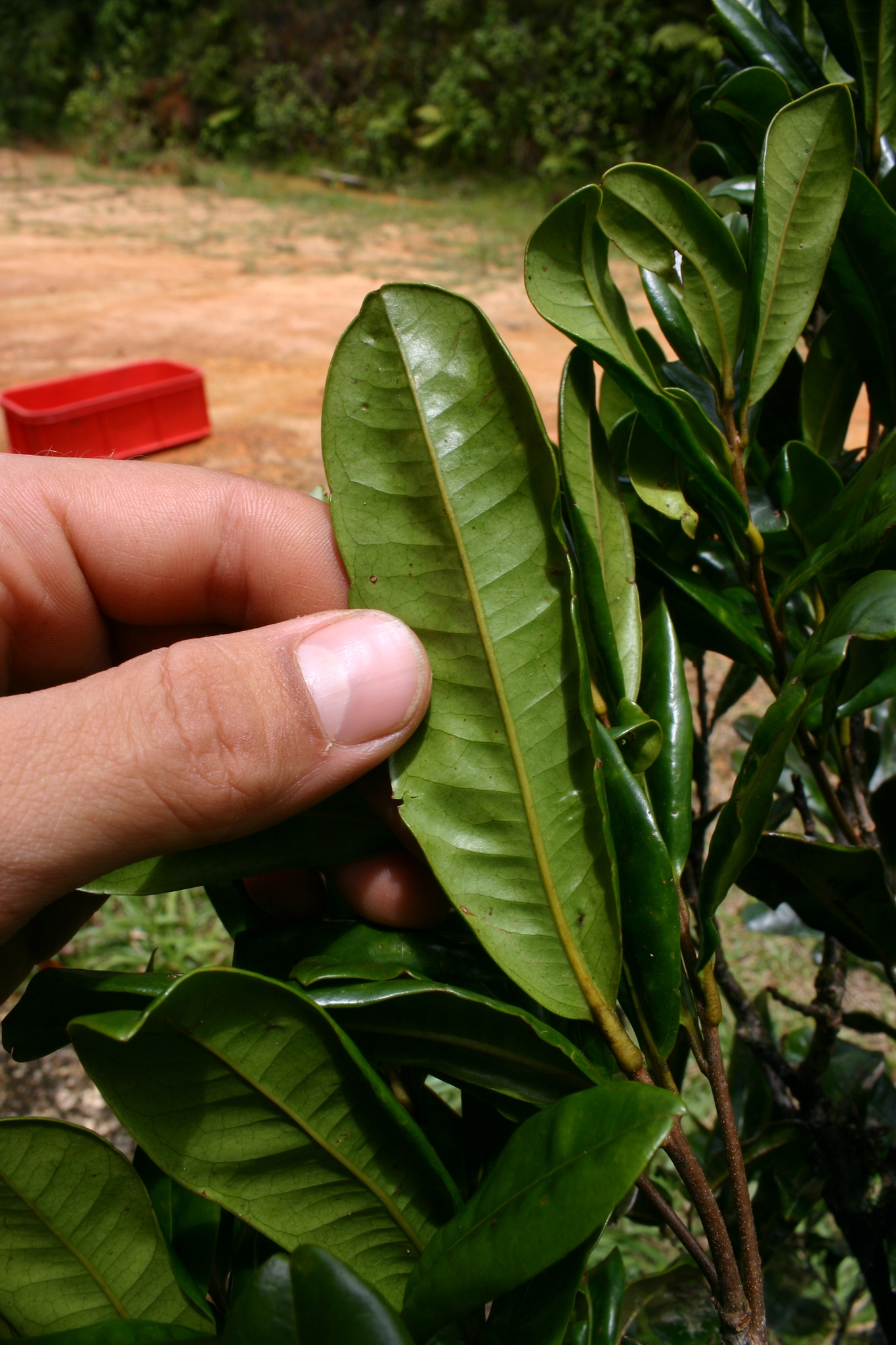

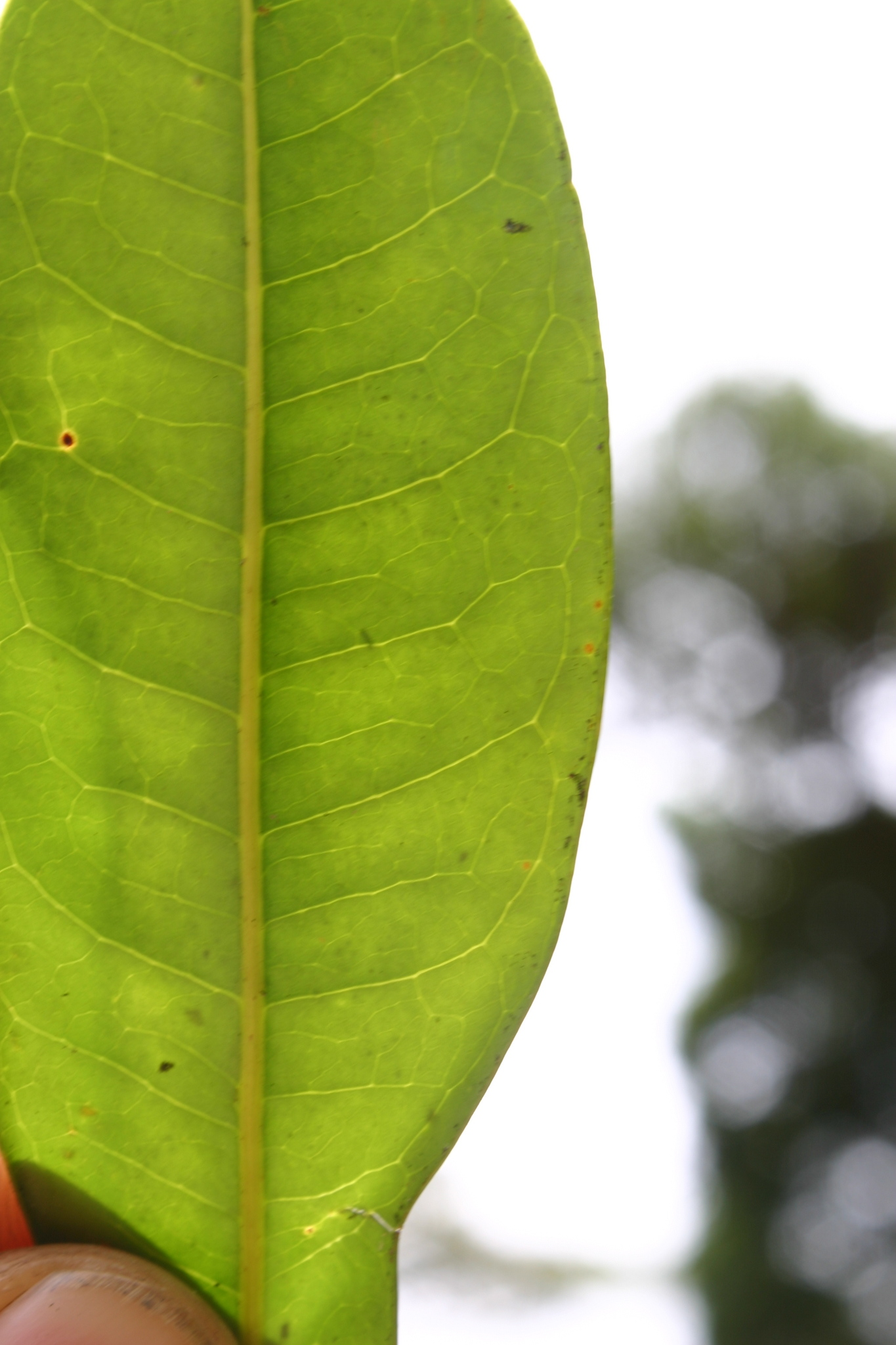
Leaf venation
