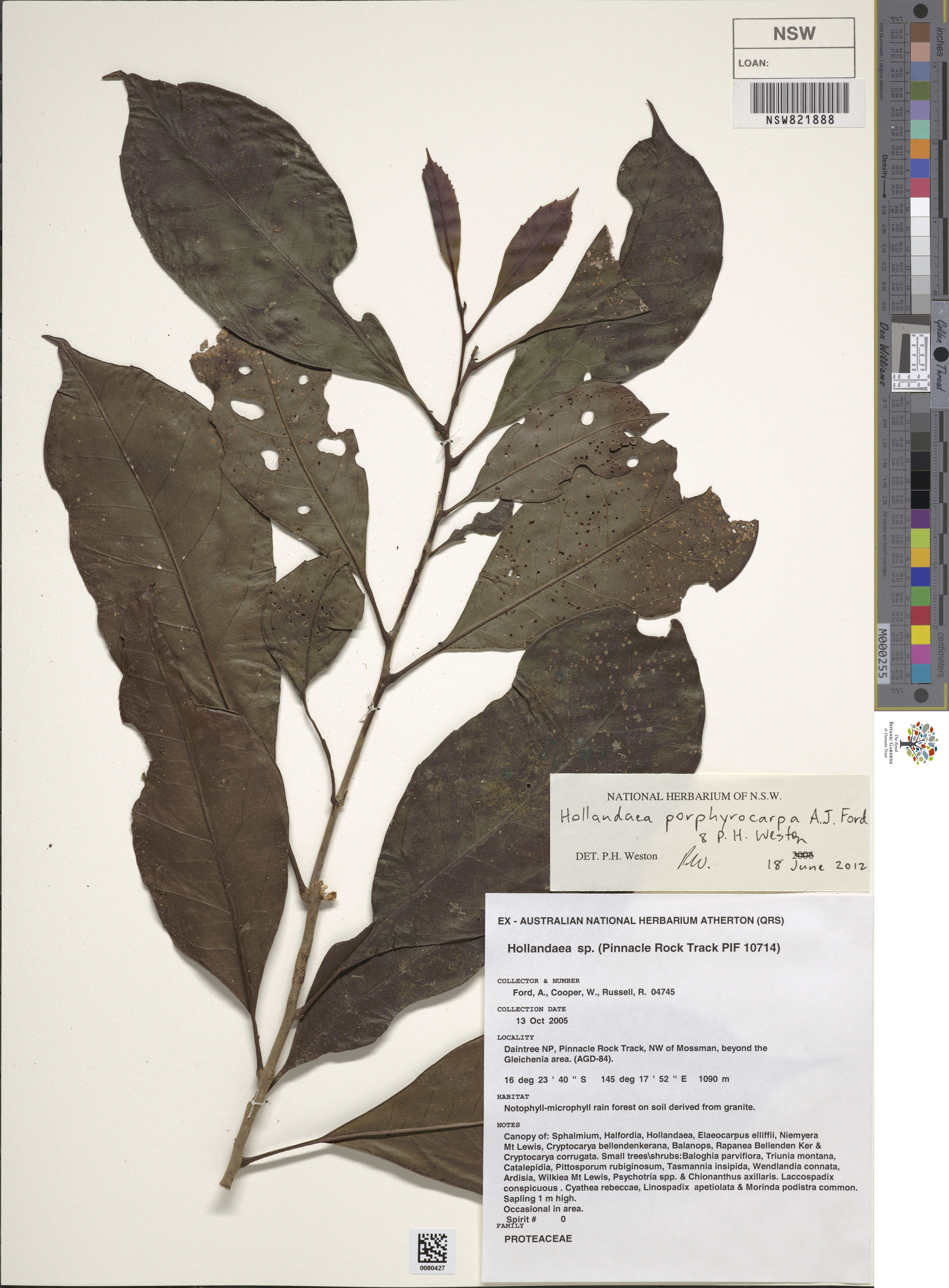
- Herbarium specimen

Conservation status
- Critically Endangered (NCA)

Scientific classification
- Kingdom: Plantae
- Clade: Tracheophytes
- Clade: Angiosperms
- Clade: Eudicots
- Order: Proteales
- Family: Proteaceae
- Genus: Hollandaea
- Species: H. porphyrocarpa

Binomial name
- Hollandaea porphyrocarpa A.J.Ford & P.H.Weston

= Hollandaea porphyrocarpa =

Species of plant endemic to Australia

Hollandaea porphyrocarpa is a species of plant in the macadamia family Proteaceae. It is endemic to a very restricted area of the rainforests of the Wet Tropics region of northeastern Queensland. First described in 2012, it has been given the conservation status of critically endangered.

== Description ==
Hollandaea porphyrocarpa is a small tree growing up to about 15 m (49 ft) tall, with a trunk up to 20 cm (8 in) diameter and no buttresses. Mature leaves are dull green and hairless on both surfaces, and can reach about 15 cm (5.9 in) long and 6 cm (2.4 in) wide. Juvenile leaves have 4–8 prominent teeth on each edge, mature leaves are either entire or sparsely toothed, and they have 6–10 conspicuous veins on either side of the midrib.

Flowering is in the form of a conflorescence up to 10 cm (4 in) long, which may emerge from the trunk, the main branches or from the twigs below the leaves, carrying 58–106 flowers. The fruit is a purple leathery follicle containing 6–9 angular seeds about 16 mm (0.6 in) long.

== Taxonomy ==
Specimens of this species were first collected in 1991, and it was formally described in a 2012 paper published by botanists Andrew James Ford and Peter Henry Weston.

== Distribution and habitat ==
Hollandaea porphyrocarpa has been found only in a small restricted area in the vicinity of Devil's Thumb, a prominent peak northwest of Mossman—Ford and Weston estimate the total area of occupancy (Note: For a definition of Area of Occupancy see this page at the Atlas of Living Australia) to be leass than 5 km^{2} (1.9 sq mi). It grows in very wet rainforest at altitudes above 1,000 m (3,300 ft).

== Conservation ==
This species is listed as critically endangered under the Queensland Government's Nature Conservation Act. As of September 2025, it has not been assessed by the International Union for Conservation of Nature (IUCN).

== Ecology ==
Bridled honeyeaters (Bolemoreus frenatus) have been observed visiting the flowers of the trees.
