= Hollandaea riparia =

Conservation status
- Vulnerable (NCA)

Scientific classification
- Kingdom: Plantae
- Clade: Tracheophytes
- Clade: Angiosperms
- Clade: Eudicots
- Order: Proteales
- Family: Proteaceae
- Genus: Hollandaea
- Species: H. riparia

Binomial name
- Hollandaea riparia B.Hyland

Species of tree from Queensland, Australia

Hollandaea riparia, sometimes named roaring Meg hollandaea, is a species of Australian rainforest tree, in the plant family Proteaceae.

They are endemic to restricted areas of the rainforests of the Wet Tropics region of northeastern Queensland. They were named for growing naturally only in riparian and gallery forest as rheophytes (river streamside plants). Botanists have found them only in a restricted natural range in the Daintree Rainforest region.

As of January 2014 this species has the official, current, Qld government conservation status of "vulnerable" species.

Australian botanist Bernie Hyland formally scientifically named and described this species in 1995 in the Flora of Australia (series).
