= Hollandaea diabolica =

Scientific classification
- Kingdom: Plantae
- Clade: Embryophytes
- Clade: Tracheophytes
- Clade: Spermatophytes
- Clade: Angiosperms
- Clade: Eudicots
- Order: Proteales
- Family: Proteaceae
- Genus: Hollandaea
- Species: H. diabolica

Binomial name
- Hollandaea diabolica A.J.Ford & P.H.Weston

Synonyms
- Proteaceae sp. 'Devils Thumb'; Orites sp. Devils Thumb (P.I.Forster + PIF10720); Hollandaea sp. (Devils Thumb P.I.Forster + PIF10720); Hollandaea sp. (Devils Thumb); Orites sp. (Pinnacle Rock Track WWC 867)

Species of Australian rainforest tree

Hollandaea diabolica is a species of Australian rainforest tree, constituting part of the plant family Proteaceae. It is endemic to restricted areas of the rainforests of the Wet Tropics region of northeastern Queensland.

Hollandaea diabolica was recognised by botanical science only as recently as the 1990s and formally scientifically described in 2012 by botanists Andrew James Ford and Peter Henry Weston. Around the early 1990s the trees were recognised only in a restricted area in the mountains west and north west of Mossman, Queensland. Another population of H. diabolica affinity was subsequently found south of Mount Bellenden Ker but collections were only of sterile material and not yet fertile and fruiting material. They may grow naturally only in the restricted mountains areas reported, further field work will clarify this.

For the restricted, disjunct and small known populations of these trees, the authorities of their 2012 species naming, Andrew Ford and Peter Weston, recommend the conservation status of vulnerable according to the International Union for Conservation of Nature (IUCN) criteria, "under categories VU, D1 and D2".
