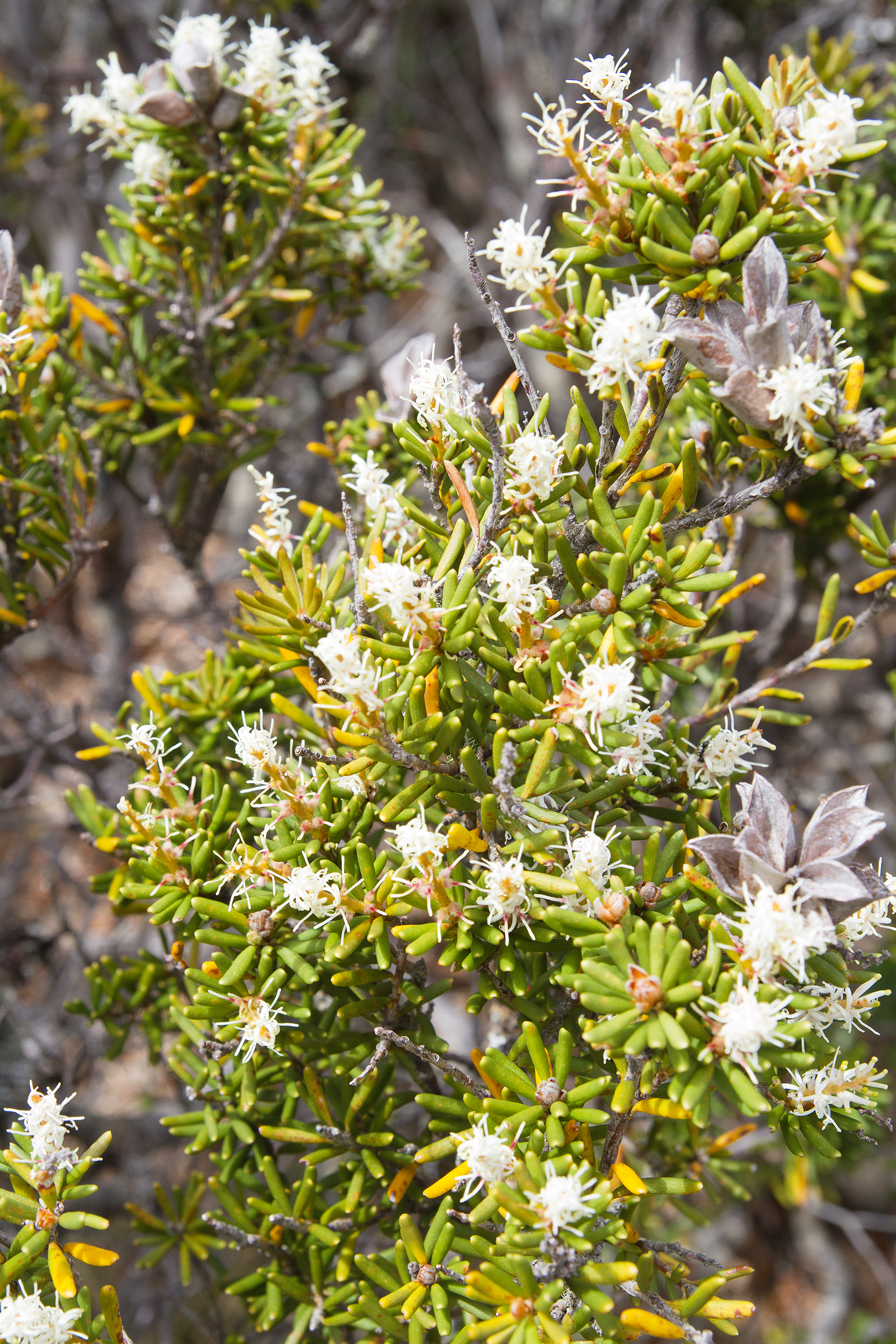
- Orites revolutus, Walls of Jerusalem National Park

Scientific classification
- Kingdom: Plantae
- Clade: Tracheophytes
- Clade: Angiosperms
- Clade: Eudicots
- Order: Proteales
- Family: Proteaceae
- Genus: Orites
- Species: O. revolutus

Binomial name
- Orites revolutus R.Br.

Synonyms
- Orites revoluta

= Orites revolutus =

Species of plant endemic to Tasmania, Australia

Orites revolutus, also known as narrow-leaf orites, is a Tasmanian endemic plant species in the family Proteaceae. Scottish botanist Robert Brown formally described the species in Transactions of the Linnean Society of London in 1810 from a specimen collected at Lake St Clair. Abundant in alpine and subalpine heath, it is a small to medium shrub 0.5 to 1.5 m (1 ft 8 in to 4 ft 11 in) tall, with relatively small, blunt leaves with strongly revolute margins. The white flowers grow on terminal spikes during summer. Being proteaceaous, O. revolutus is likely to provide a substantial food source for nectivorous animal species within its range.

== Description ==
Orites revolutus grows as a spreading bush or an erect, woody shrub, usually 0.5–1.5 m (1 ft 8 in – 4 ft 11 in) in height. Branching is dense and the leaves are alternate up the stem. Leaf shape is narrow and fairly blunt at the apex, 7–20 mm long, 1-1.5 mm wide, with tightly revolute margins and a hairy surface on the underside. Flowering occurs in early to mid-summer with the sour-scented flowers arising on terminal spikes to twice the length of the leaves. White in colour, they are 5 mm long, actinomorphic and bisexual with 4 adnate stamens and a superior ovary. The corolla is valvate, tubular in bud and split at maturity. Fruit is a hairy follicle to 15mm containing winged seeds.

The species is often confused with Olearia ledifolia in the field; however, this unrelated plant lacks the woody follicles.

== Evolution and taxonomy ==
Orites revolutus is 1 of 9 species in the genus Orites, with 7 endemic to Australia and only 4 in Tasmania. The remaining 2 species reside in the Chilean Andes and Bolivia. Recent phylogenetic work suggests the genus Orites spread over the Gondwanan continent from South America to Australia during the Paleogene, reaching Australia by the Early Oligocene. Fossils of Orites revolutus indistinguishable from contemporary specimens have been recorded in Early Pleistocene sediments from western Tasmania, suggesting the species is at least this old.

The name Orites revoluta (referring to the tightly revolute leaf margins) was first published by the Linnean Society of London in March 1810 in the paper On the natural order of plants called Proteaceae by Robert Brown. However, the orthographic variant Orites revolutus is used just as widely and is often reported to be the more correct species name.

Brown's paper also established the genus Orites, named for the Greek oreites, meaning “a mountaineer” (denoting the montane distribution of the genus). The paper included dozens of pages of taxonomic revisions for the family Proteaceae, although much of this important work is not officially attributed to Brown.

== Distribution ==
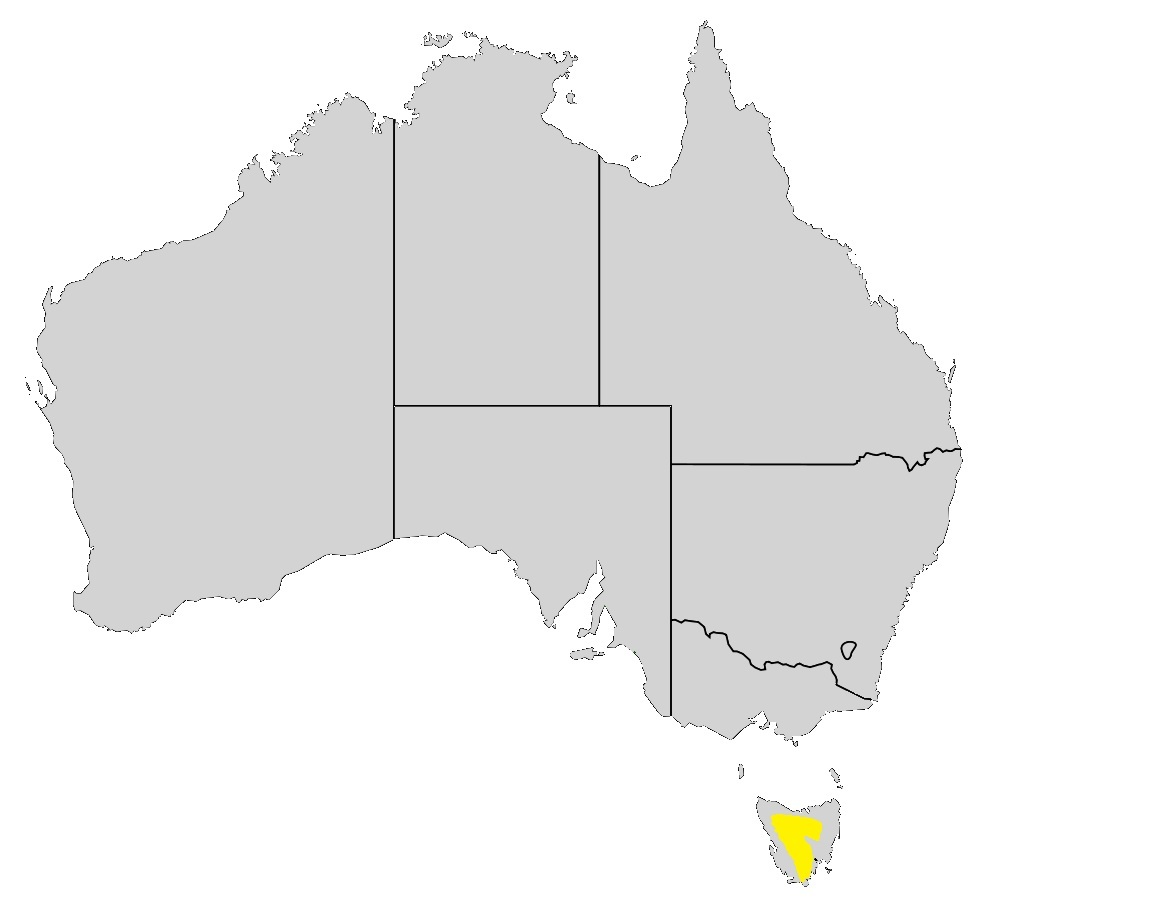
Distribution map of Orites revolutus showing Tasmanian restriction

Orites revolutus is endemic to Tasmania, however it is extensive on mountain plateaus at altitudes ranging from 700 to 1,300 m (2,300 to 4,300 ft). It occurs in rocky areas of better drained soil within alpine and subalpine heaths and woodlands, and may be present both on dolerite and sedimentary substrates. The mean annual temperature within the plant's range hovers around 8 °C (46 °F) and rainfall tends to be as high as 1700 or even 2000 mm (67–78 in) annually. Orites revolutus can be seen at many localities within the state including the Hartz Mountains, Mount Field, Cradle Mountain-Lake St Clair and Ben Lomond National Parks, as well as Wellington Park near Tasmania's capital city of Hobart.

== Ecology ==
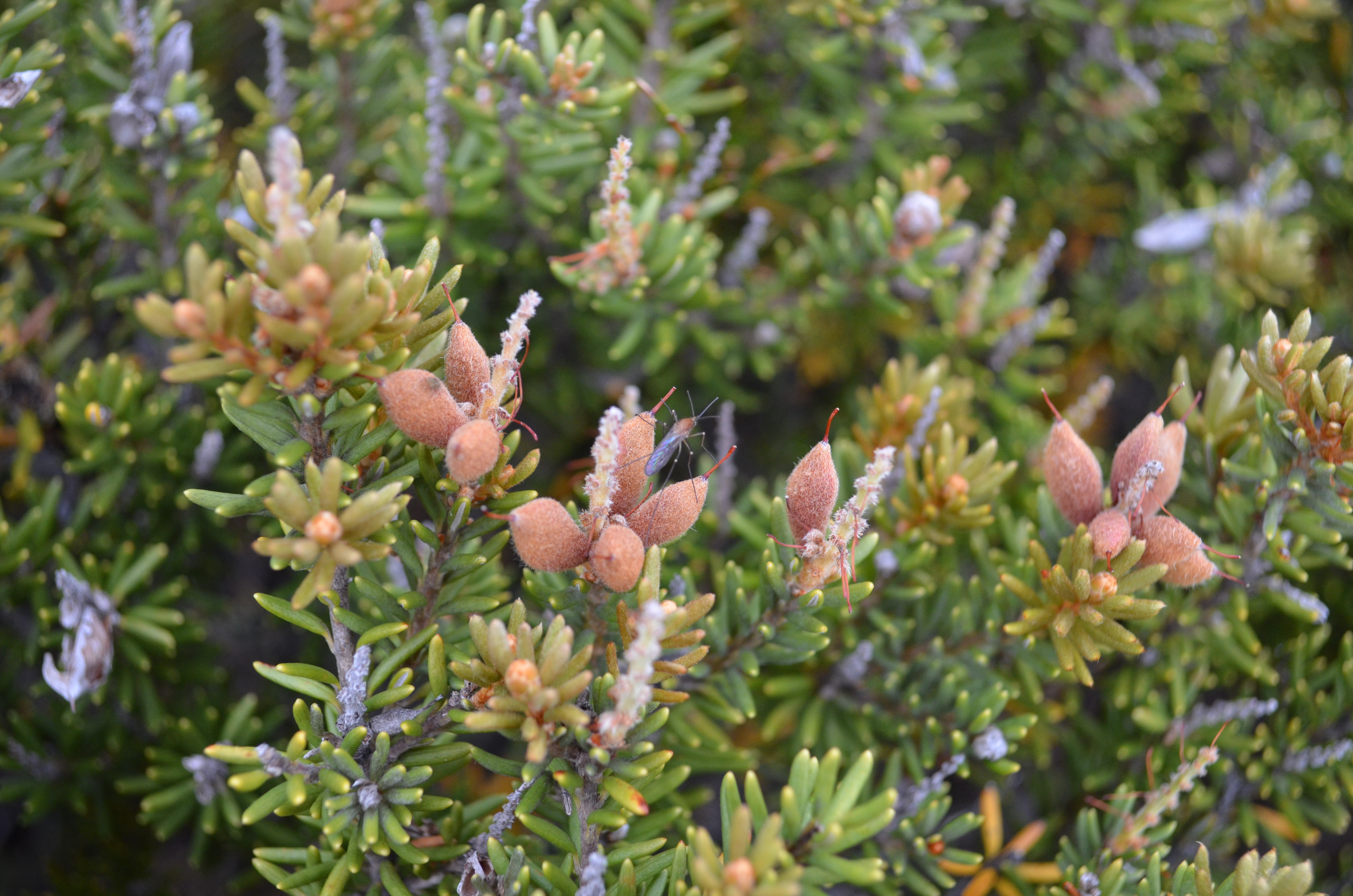
An insect visitor to Orites revoluta

Orites revolutus is a prominent shrub in alpine and subalpine sclerophyll heath and woodland, commonly occurring alongside Epacris serpyllifolia, Baeckea gunniana, Richea sprengelioides, Eucalyptus coccifera, Empodisma minus, Leptospermum rupestre and Orites acicularis. The two Orites species tend to be roughly similar in their distribution and dominance within the vegetation.

The sour-smelling white flowers arise in terminal spikes in early to mid-summer (December and January). Surveys of insect visitors to Orites species in mainland Australia and New Zealand suggest pollination by small to medium insects such as bees in the genera Lasioglossum and Hylaeus and many types of flies including families Syrphidae, Calliphoridae, Muscidae, Empididae and Tachinidae, all of which occur in Tasmania. This is consistent with the tendency of many Orites species to display purple ‘bee lines’ on the white to cream tepals.

Numerous seeds develop in hairy follicles over the following months. Orites revolutus may be heavily infested by the seed parasite Symphygas nephaula, which lays its eggs in the developing flower bud before the seed pods have formed. After hatching, the larvae feed on the maturing seeds as they become available. Orites revolutus is a preferred host for this tortricid moth borer as compared to O. acicularis, which has a heavily overlapping range, and plants at lower altitudes are more likely to become infested. It is thought that this parasite may be the most important agent of predispersal seed loss in the plant.

The mature follicles dry and split open, releasing the seeds into the nearby environment. The seeds will remain in the soil until there is sufficient disturbance (such as a wildfire) to stimulate their germination, or until they are no longer viable. Studies of alpine and subalpine heath indicate a minimum average fire-free period greater than 250 years, and it is unlikely that many seeds will persist this long. It appears that plants of O. revolutus maintain themselves predominantly through vegetative propagation during the long disturbance free periods, and the great majority of young plants are the result of underground stems. It is therefore possible that the high levels of parasitism witnessed in the seed pods of O. revolutus represent a negligible impact on recruitment. Indeed, O. revolutus is one of the few species in the community able to resprout after fire, a character absent even in O. acicularis

Many species of arthropods have been observed inhabiting O. revolutus plants, including members of the families Sminthuridae, Entomobryidae, Membracidae, Curculionidae, and Miridae, and species from the genera Diaea, Rhyzobius, and Nannochorista. Orites revolutus supports a higher arthropod diversity than the generally co-dominant O. acicularis, possibly due to the plant's more complex shape (and therefore niche mosaic), although this diversity is only evident in full sized plants. Consistent with this higher diversity is a reduction in ecological dominance by a handful of taxa.

O. revolutus’ namesake revolute leaf margins are very likely an adaption to the harsh growing conditions of its range, presumably adding structural integrity to leaves often exposed to frost, sleet and driving wind, as well as very high UV levels. The margins would also reduce air movement across the stomata, presumably protecting the plant from desiccation. This is supported by observations that plants growing in shady subalpine pockets—where the need for sunlight may offset the need for a tough exterior—tend to have flatter or broader leaves with recurved rather than revolute margins.

Little is known about pathogenic microbial interactions with O. revolutus, however there is clear evidence of dieback in Tasmania's Central Highlands that may be attributed to a Phytophthora species.
