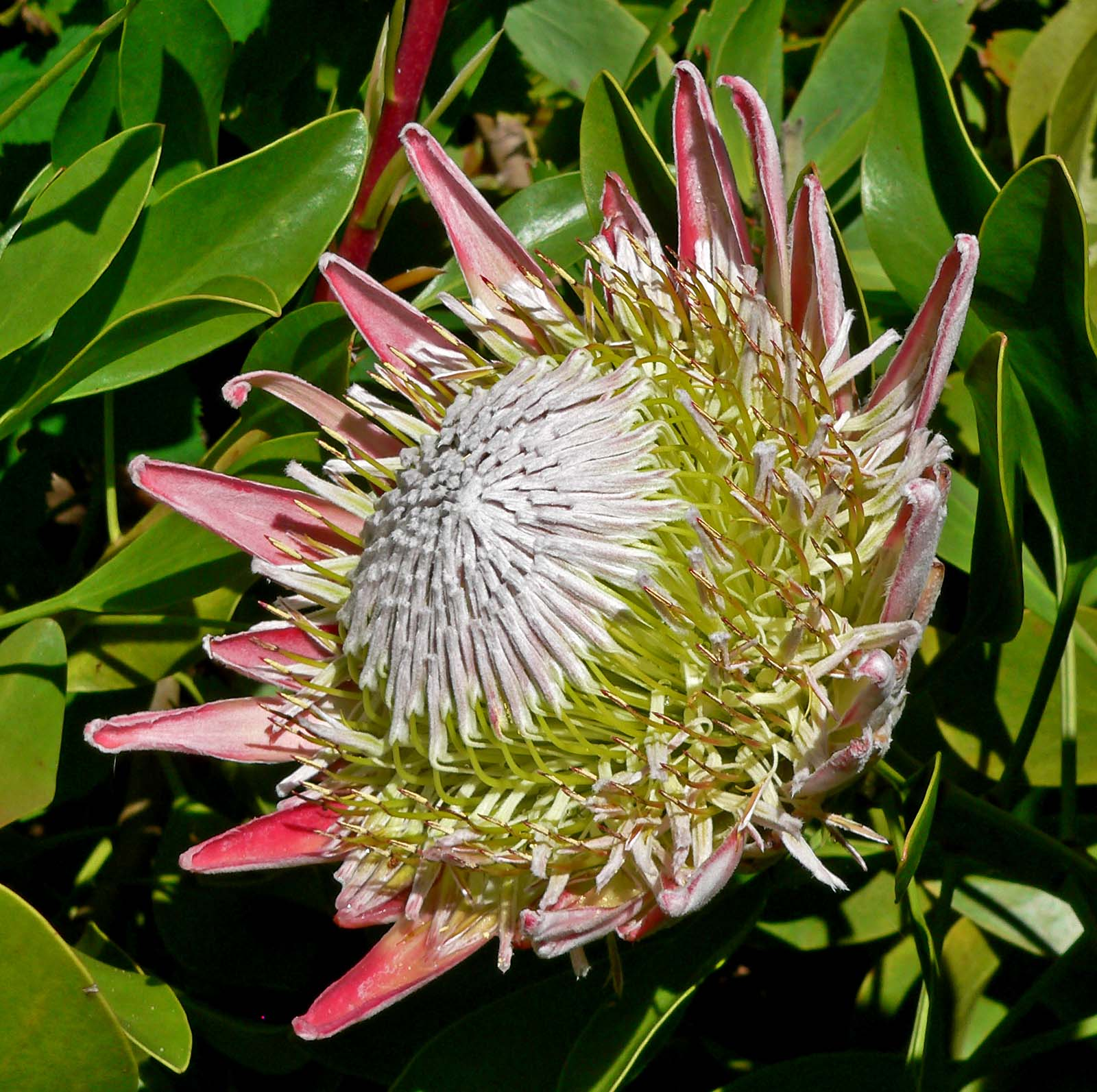
- Protea cynaroides

Scientific classification
- Kingdom: Plantae
- Clade: Tracheophytes
- Clade: Angiosperms
- Clade: Eudicots
- Order: Proteales
- Family: Proteaceae
- Subfamily: Proteoideae; Eaton

Genera
- See text

= Proteoideae =

Subfamily of flowering plants

Proteoideae is one of the five subfamilies of the plant family Proteaceae. The greatest diversity of the subfamily is in Africa, but there are also many species in Australia. A few species occur in South America, New Caledonia, and elsewhere.

== Taxonomy ==
Proteoideae was essentially defined by Robert Brown in his 1810 On the natural order of plants called Proteaceae. Brown divided Proteaceae into two "sections" based on whether or not the fruits were dehiscent or indehiscenct. He also noted that

"in dividing the order into two sections from the structure of the ovarium, it will be found that while all the single-seeded genera have each flower subtended by a proper bractea, or more rarely are without one, those with two or more seeds have, with very few exceptions, the flowers of their spikes of clusters disposed in pairs, each pair being furnished with only one bractea common to both flowers...."

Brown's two "sections" corresponded closely with what are now recognised as the two largest Proteaceae subfamilies, Proteoideae and Grevilleoideae, and both the indehiscence of Proteoideae and the paired flowers of Grevilleoideae are still recognised as key diagnostic characters.

Brown did not publish names for his two sections, and it would not be until 1836 that the name Proteoideae would be published by Amos Eaton. The modern framework for classification of the genera within Proteaceae was laid by L. A. S. Johnson and Barbara Briggs in their influential 1975 monograph "On the Proteaceae: the evolution and classification of a southern family". Their classification has been refined somewhat over the ensuing three decades, mot notably by Peter Weston and Nigel Barker in 2006, who included in Proteoideae the monophyletic Eidotheoideae, but separated from it two genera as the new Symphionematoideae. Proteaceae is now divided into five subfamilies, of which Proteoideae is the second largest. It is defined as those species having cluster roots, solitary ovules and indehiscent fruits. Proteoideae is further divided into four tribes: Conospermeae, Petrophileae, Proteae and Leucadendreae:

Family Proteaceae

Subfamily Bellendenoideae (1 genus, Bellendena)
Subfamily Persoonioideae (2 tribes, 5 genera)
Subfamily Symphionematoideae (2 genera)
Subfamily Proteoideae

incertae sedis

Eidothea — Beauprea — Beaupreopsis — Dilobeia — Cenarrhenes — Franklandia

Tribe Conospermeae

Subtribe Stirlingiinae

Stirlingia

Subtribe Conosperminae

Conospermum — Synaphea

Tribe Petrophileae

Petrophile — Aulax

Tribe Proteeae

Protea — Faurea

Tribe Leucadendreae

Subtribe Isopogoninae

Isopogon

Subtribe Adenanthinae

Adenanthos

Subtribe Leucadendrinae

Leucadendron — Serruria — Paranomus — Vexatorella — Sorocephalus — Spatalla — Leucospermum — Mimetes — Diastella — Orothamnus

Subfamily Grevilleoideae (4 tribes, 10 subtribes, 31 genera)

== Distribution and habitat ==
Like the family as a whole, Proteoideae has a southern hemisphere distribution, spanning Africa, Australia and South America. Africa is the main centre of biodiversity. Australia has similar number of genera but fewer species. The subfamily is poorly represented in South America.
