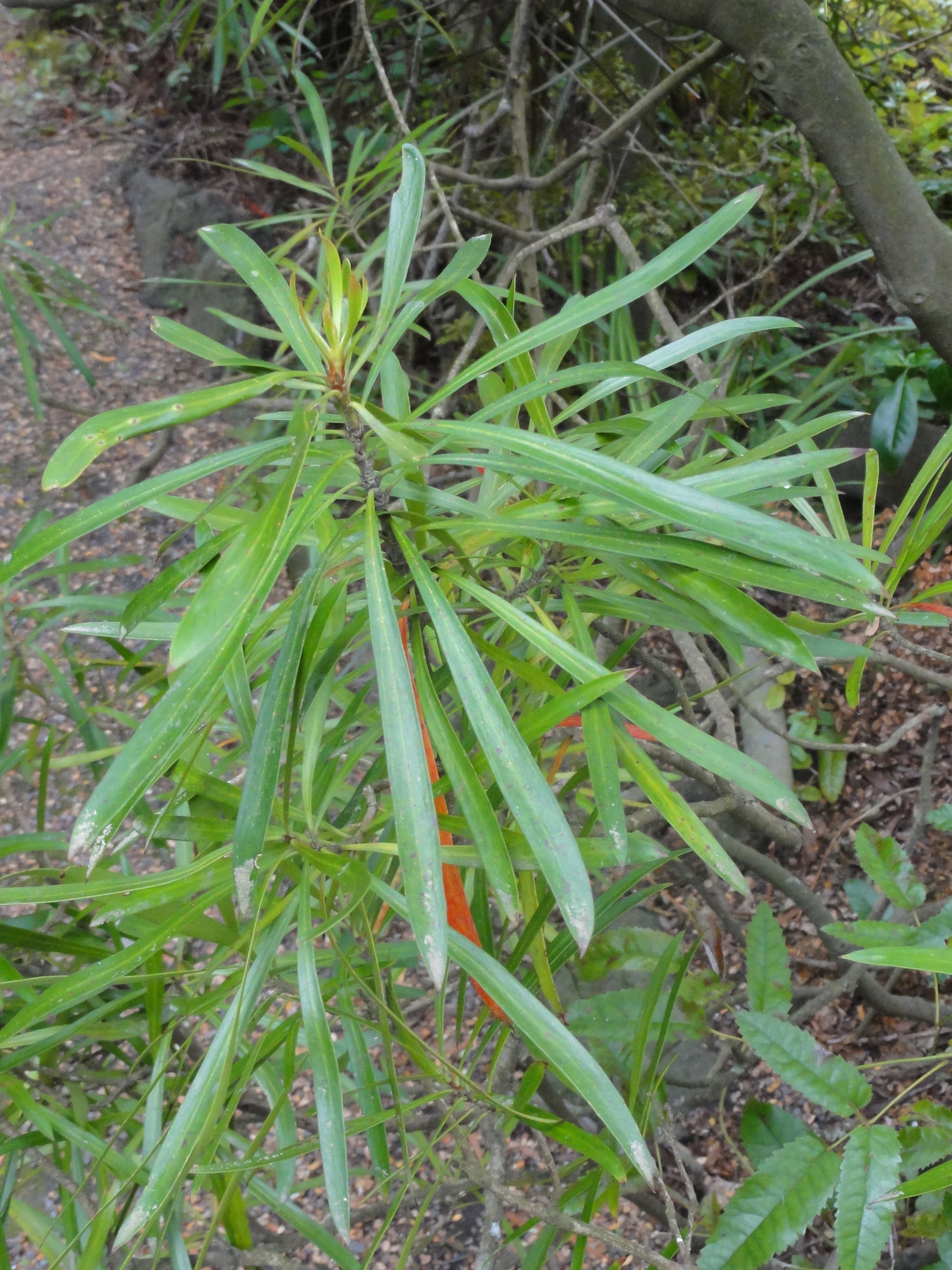
- Toronia toru

Scientific classification
- Kingdom: Plantae
- Clade: Embryophytes
- Clade: Tracheophytes
- Clade: Angiosperms
- Clade: Eudicots
- Order: Proteales
- Family: Proteaceae
- Subfamily: Persoonioideae
- Tribe: Persoonieae
- Genus: Toronia; L.A.S.Johnson & B.G.Briggs
- Species: T. toru

Binomial name
- Toronia toru (A. Cunn.) L.A.S.Johnson & B.G.Briggs

= Toronia =

Genus of trees

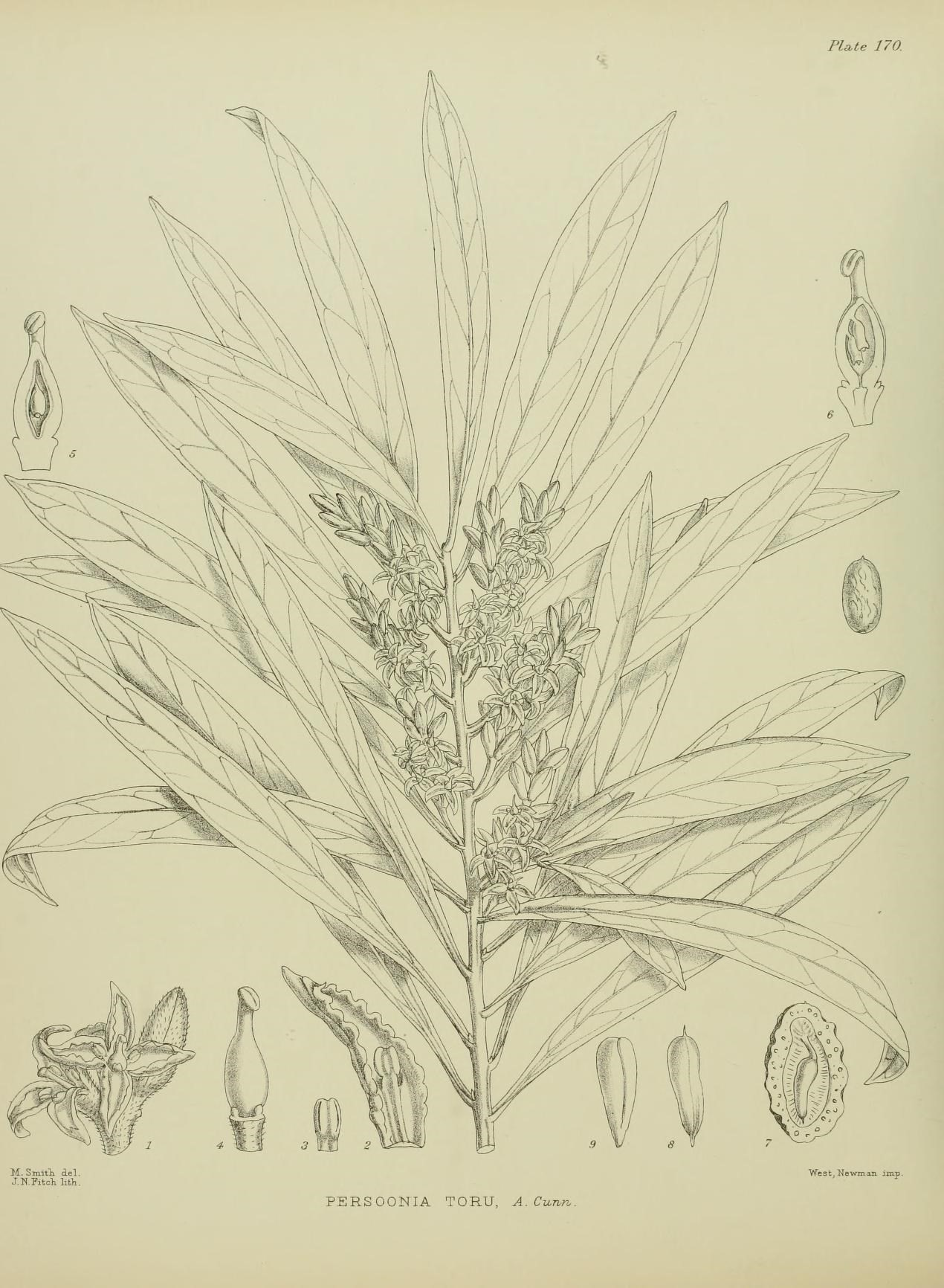
Illustration by Matilda Smith

Toronia is a genus of tree in the family Proteaceae that contains a single species, Toronia toru, which is endemic to New Zealand. The genus is closely related to the large genus Persoonia, and in fact this species was long regarded as one until placed in its own new genus by Lawrie Johnson and Barbara G. Briggs in their 1975 monograph "On the Proteaceae: the evolution and classification of a southern family".

However, phylogenetic studies indicate that Toronia is nested in the larger genus Persoonia, where it was once included.

Toronia toru is an evergreen tree found in the northern half of the North Island and is one of only two members of the protea family occurring in New Zealand.

Toronia toru grows to 7–11 metres (23–36 ft) and has long slender green leaves, small yellow flowers, and red to dark purple-blue fleshy fruits.
