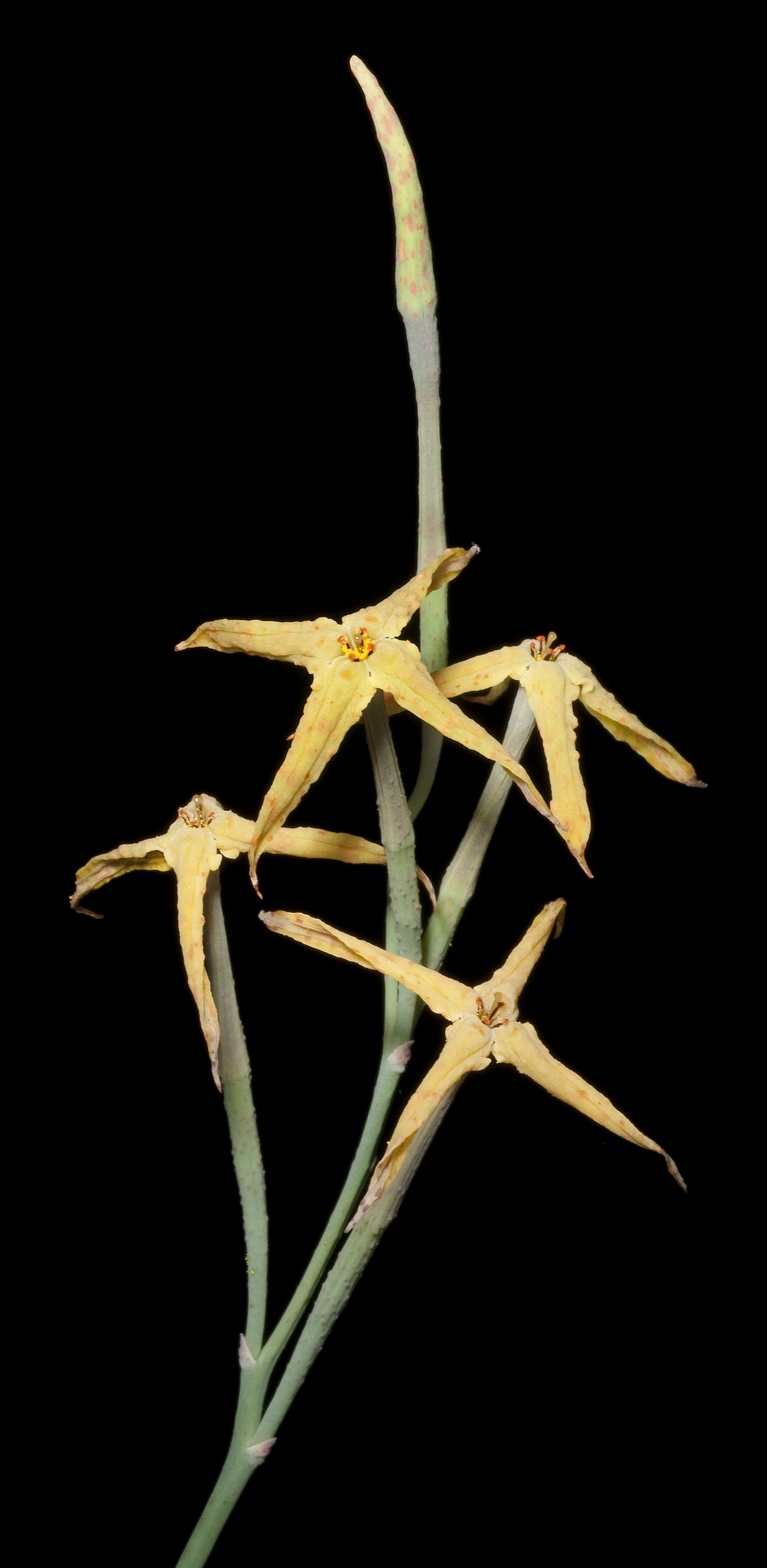

Scientific classification
- Kingdom: Plantae
- Clade: Tracheophytes
- Clade: Angiosperms
- Clade: Eudicots
- Order: Proteales
- Family: Proteaceae
- Genus: Franklandia
- Species: F. fucifolia

Binomial name
- Franklandia fucifolia R.Br.

= Franklandia fucifolia =

Species of plant

Franklandia fucifolia, or lanoline bush, is a species of flowering plant. It is native to the south-west of Western Australia. It belongs to the Proteaceae family.

It was first described by Robert Brown in 1810.

== Description ==
Franklandia fucifolia is a small shrub, which has a fire-tolerant rootstock, and has no surface covering except for the fruit. The leaves are alternate, and divided into erect, terete lobes with prominent glands. The inflorescence is a terminal, few-flowered raceme. The perianth is tubular and has four horizontal lobes. The stamens are inserted at the top of the tube. The ovary is sessile, with one ovule. The fruit is a narrow nut, topped with a rounded-triangular concave plate (5–6 mm wide) and hairy on the outside.

== Distribution & habitat ==
It is widespread in south-western Western Australia, being found from William Bay to Israelite Bay, extending inland to Kojonup and growing on sand in kwongan, and open woodland.
