= Franklandia triaristata =

Scientific classification
- Kingdom: Plantae
- Clade: Tracheophytes
- Clade: Angiosperms
- Clade: Eudicots
- Order: Proteales
- Family: Proteaceae
- Genus: Franklandia
- Species: F. triaristata

Binomial name
- Franklandia triaristata Benth., 1870

Species of plant

Franklandia triaristata, also known as lanoline bush, is a species of flowering plant in the protea family that is found in south-western Western Australia.

== Description ==
The plant grows from a lignotuber as a shrub up to a metre in height. It has smooth, alternate leaves, 40–310 mm in length. The flowers are white to yellow, with purplish-brown markings, flowering from August to October.

== Distribution and habitat ==
The species has a restricted range in south-western Western Australia, in the vicinity of the local government areas of Augusta, Margaret River, Busselton, Capel and Nannup, where it grows on white or grey sandy soils.
