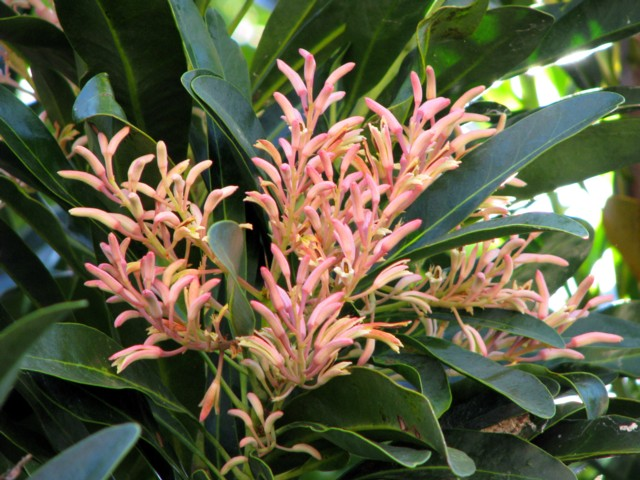

Conservation status
- Least Concern (IUCN 3.1)

Scientific classification
- Kingdom: Plantae
- Clade: Embryophytes
- Clade: Tracheophytes
- Clade: Angiosperms
- Clade: Eudicots
- Order: Proteales
- Family: Proteaceae
- Subfamily: Persoonioideae
- Tribe: Placospermeae
- Genus: Placospermum; C.T.White & W.D.Francis
- Species: P. coriaceum

Binomial name
- Placospermum coriaceum C.T.White & W.D.Francis

= Placospermum =

Genus of trees

Placospermum is a monotypic genus of large tree in the plant family Proteaceae. The single species; Placospermum coriaceum, commonly known as rose silky oak or plate-seeded oak is endemic to the wet tropical rainforests of northeastern Queensland, Australia.

== History ==
The genus and species were first formally scientifically described in 1924 by Cyril T. White and William D. Francis. The precise relationships of the genus were unclear, though it was clear it was an early offshoot within the Proteaceae and retained primitive characteristics, until Lawrie Johnson and Barbara G. Briggs classified it in the subfamily Persoonioideae in their 1975 monograph "On the Proteaceae: the evolution and classification of a southern family". They noted that it had large chromosomes, like those of Persoonia and allied genera, as well as sharing some other primitive features.

== Description ==
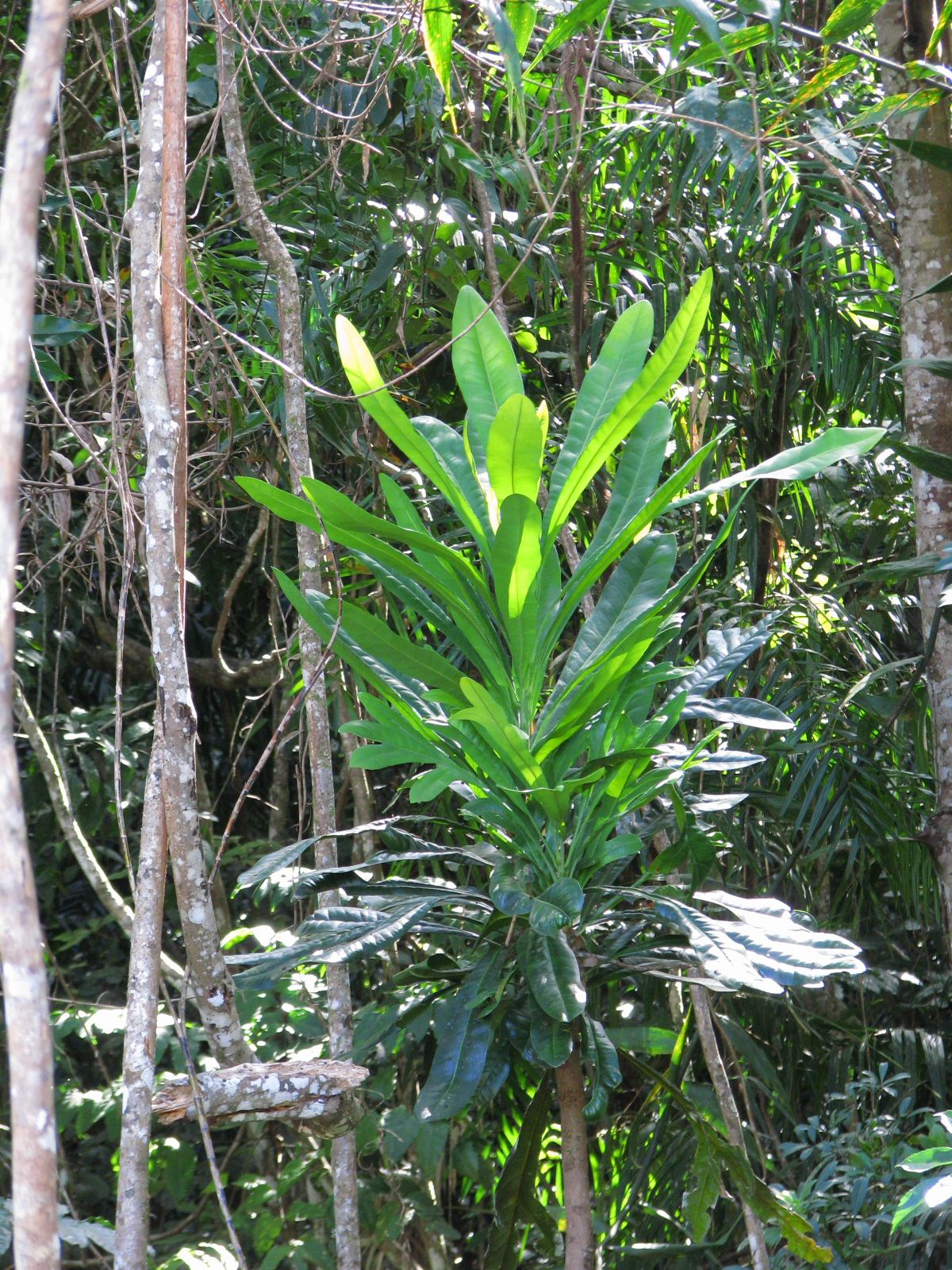
Placospermum coriaceum sapling, Kuranda, Queensland, 27 June 2009

Placospermum coriaceum trees grow to 30 m (100 ft) tall in their native rainforests, and are likely to be much smaller in cultivation. Leaves on the youngest plants are simple and oblanceolate, but large lobed intermediate leaves soon appear. These are up to 90 cm (36 in) long with up to nine lobes up to 20 cm (8 in) long each. The adult leaves are once again simple, and are spathulate or oblanceolate and up to 17 cm (7 in) long and leathery. The pinkish flowers grow in racemes at the end of branches. Flattened oval fruit follow, which measure 3.5-4 by 3 cm. Each contains many seeds. Like other members of the Persoonioideae, Placospermum coriaceum lacks the cluster roots typical of most Proteaceae.

The large lobed immature leaves are an attractive feature, and Placospermum coriaceum has been cultivated as an indoor plant.

== Distribution and habitat ==
Placospermum coriaceum is endemic to the north-eastern tropical rainforest region of Queensland, Australia. It grows at a variety of altitudes ranging from 1,100 metres (3,600 ft) above sea level to at sea level. It is a locally common species that is not considered to be threatened and it is listed as 'Least concern' on the IUCN Red List of Threatened Species.
