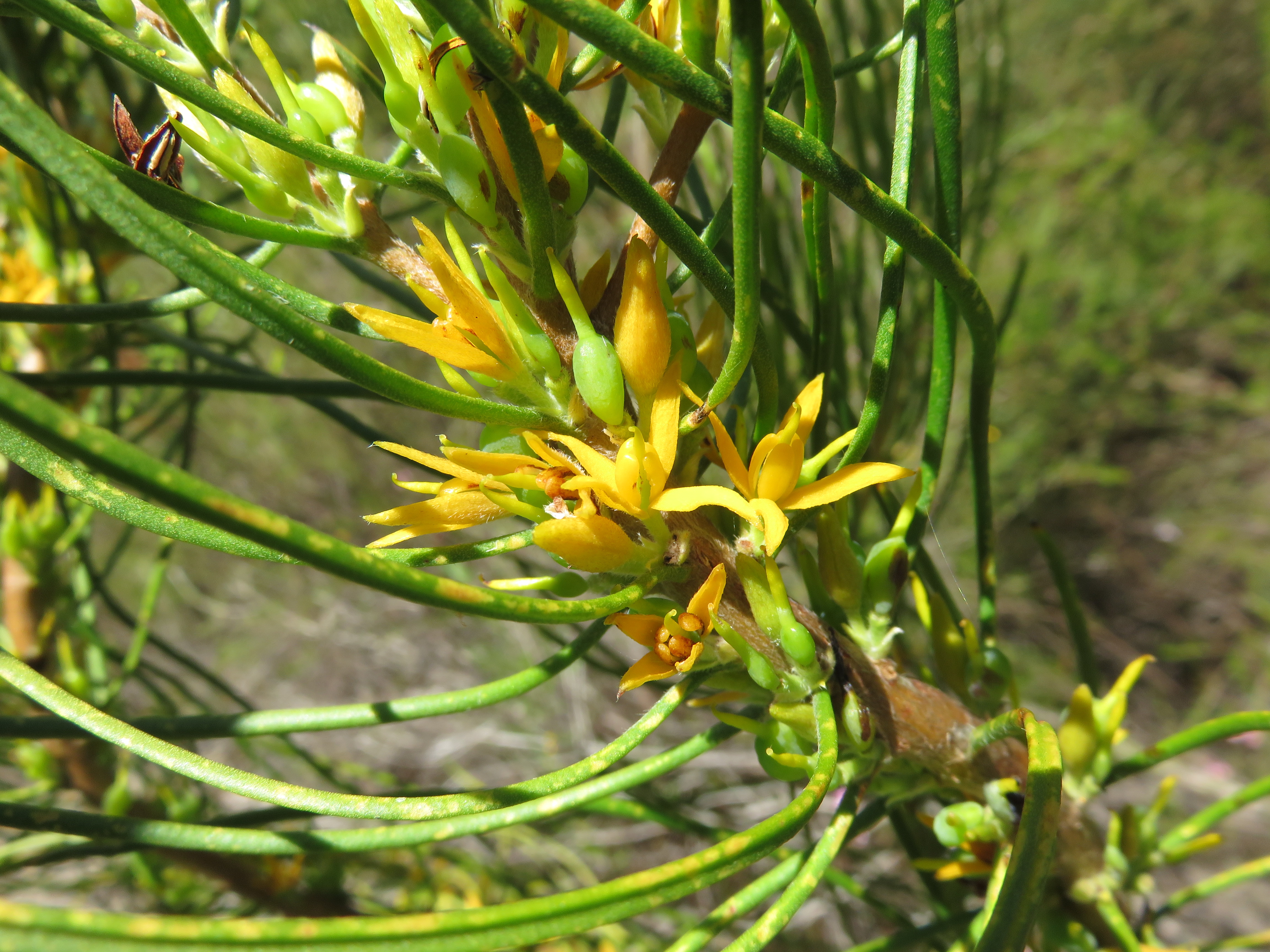
- Acidonia microcarpa at Lake Jasper, D'Entrecasteaux National Park

Scientific classification
- Kingdom: Plantae
- Clade: Embryophytes
- Clade: Tracheophytes
- Clade: Spermatophytes
- Clade: Angiosperms
- Clade: Eudicots
- Order: Proteales
- Family: Proteaceae
- Subfamily: Persoonioideae
- Tribe: Persoonieae
- Genus: Acidonia; L.A.S.Johnson & B.G.Briggs
- Species: A. microcarpa

Binomial name
- Acidonia microcarpa (R.Br.) L.A.S.Johnson & B.G.Briggs

= Acidonia =

Monotypic genus of shrub

Acidonia microcarpa is a species of shrub in the plant family Proteaceae, and is the only species in the genus Acidonia. It is endemic to the south coast of the Southwest Botanic Province of Western Australia.

== Description ==
This is a smooth-barked shrub reaching up to 3 m (9.8 ft) in height. Small branches are hairy and ribbed, the leaves are long and narrow, measuring up to 13 cm (5.1 in) long and just 1.8 mm (0.07 in) wide. The flowers are bright yellow and about 10 mm (0.39 in) long.

== Taxonomy ==
It was originally published by Robert Brown in 1810 as a species of Persoonia. In 1975, Lawrence Alexander Sidney Johnson and Barbara G. Briggs erected the genus Acidonia, transferring a great many Persoonia species into it. Later, the circumscription of Acidonia was changed to include only A. microcarpa.

However, phylogenetic studies indicate that Acidonia is nested in the larger genus Persoonia, where it was once included.

== Distribution and habitat ==
Acidonia microcarpa occurs in the far southwestern corner of Western Australia, from Margaret River to Albany and within 50 km (31 mi) of the coast. It grows on sandy soils on the margins of water bodies and swamps.
