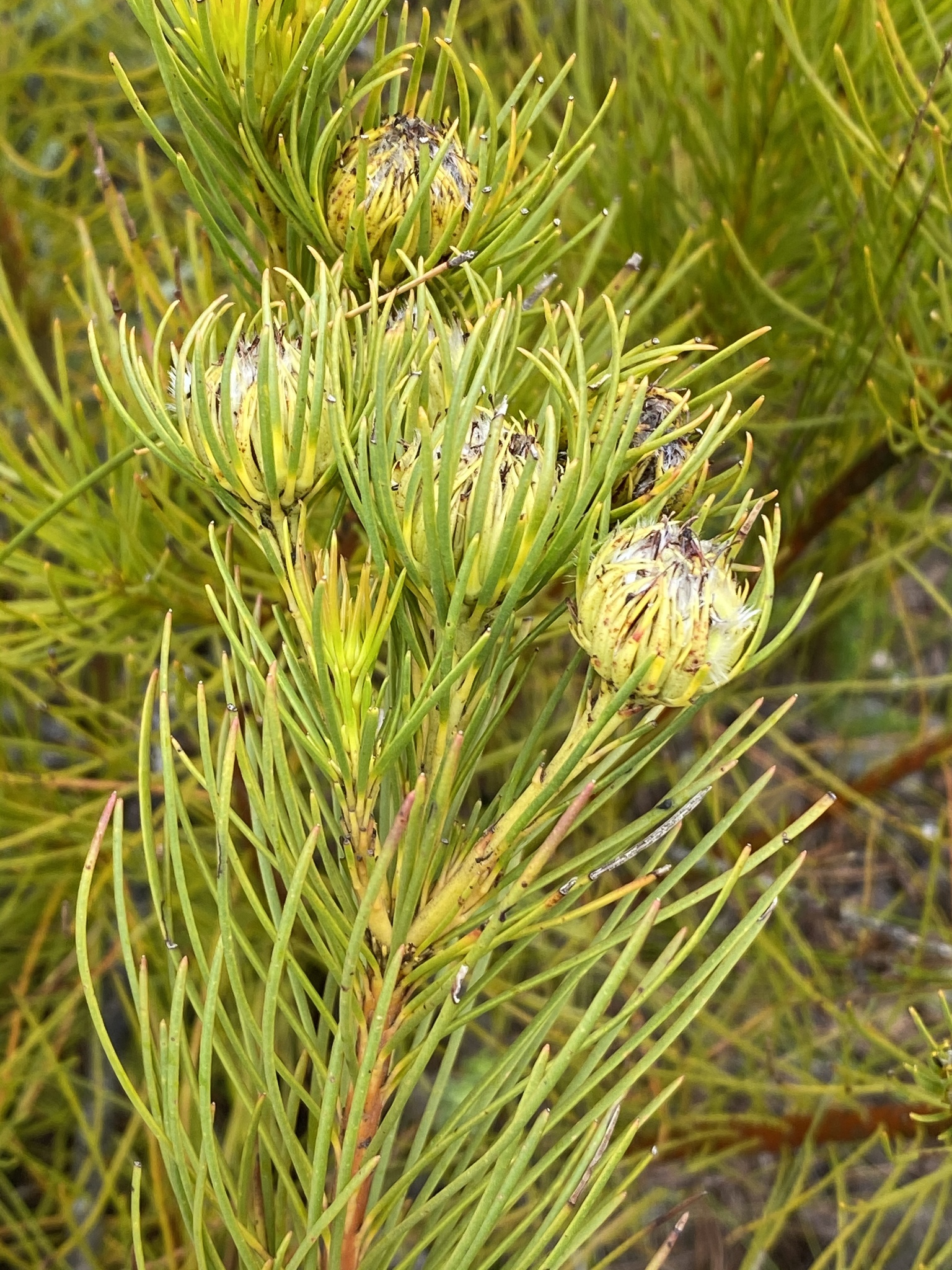

Conservation status
- Least Concern (IUCN 3.1)

Scientific classification
- Kingdom: Plantae
- Clade: Tracheophytes
- Clade: Angiosperms
- Clade: Eudicots
- Order: Proteales
- Family: Proteaceae
- Genus: Aulax
- Species: A. pallasia

Binomial name
- Aulax pallasia Stapf

= Aulax pallasia =

Species of flowering shrub

Aulax pallasia, the needle-leaf featherbush, is a species of shrub in the genus Aulax. It is native to the Western Cape, South Africa.

== Description ==
The shrub grows upright with a single stem and grows up to 3.0 m (9.8 ft) tall. There are few twigs on the trunk. The plant sprouts again after a fire. The plant is bisexual and male and female flowers grow on different plants. The plants bloom from January to April. It is pollinated by a variety of insect species. Female flowers dry out and form a woody shell in which the seeds are formed and preserved. The seeds are spread by the wind.

In Afrikaans, it known as Naaldblaarkanariebos.

== Distribution and habitat ==
The plant is widespread. It occurs from Piketberg and Koue Bokkeveldberg to Hottentots Hollandberg and Groenlandberg to the middle of the Langeberg and the Riviersonderendberg. It grows in mountainous environments in sandstone soil at altitudes of 800 to 2,000 m (2,600 to 6,600 ft).
