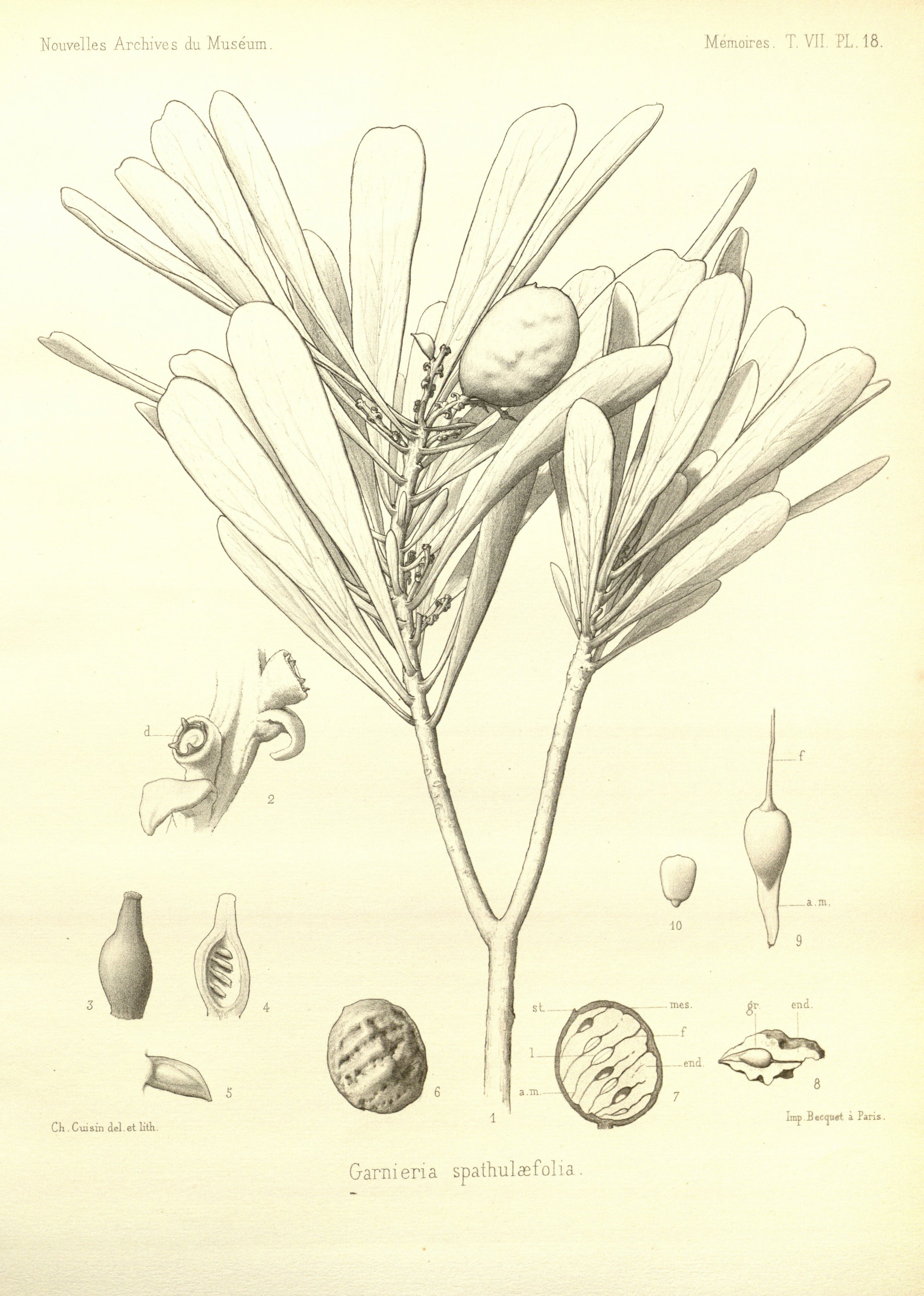

Conservation status
- Least Concern (IUCN 3.1)

Scientific classification
- Kingdom: Plantae
- Clade: Embryophytes
- Clade: Tracheophytes
- Clade: Angiosperms
- Clade: Eudicots
- Order: Proteales
- Family: Proteaceae
- Subfamily: Persoonioideae
- Tribe: Persoonieae
- Genus: Persoonia
- Species: P. spathulifolia

Binomial name
- Persoonia spathulifolia (Brongn. & Gris) Pillon

Synonyms
- Cenarrhenes spathulata Pancher & Sebert; Cenarrhenes spathulifolia Brongn. & Gris; Garnieria spathulifolia (Brongn. & Gris) Brongn. & Gris

= Persoonia spathulifolia =

Species of flowering plant

Persoonia spathulifolia is a species of flowering plant in the family Proteaceae. It is a shrub or small tree endemic to New Caledonia.

== Description ==
The plant grows as a shrub up to 2 m (6 ft 7 in) in height, sometimes a small tree up to 4 m (13 ft). Its shiny leaves are dark green above, paler below. The fruits are green at first, becoming dark crimson to brown. The flowers are white and scented.

== Range and habitat ==
It ranges across Grande Terre, from Grand Massif Sud to the northwest of the island with an extension to Mont Monéo in the northeast. It grows on ultramafic substrates as an understory tree in dense forest and in scrubland from 20 to 900 metres (66 to 3,000 ft) elevation.

== Taxonomy ==
The type specimen was collected at Prony Bay in 1868–1870 by Benjamin Balansa. The species was first described Cenarrhenes spathulifolia by Adolphe-Théodore Brongniart & Jean Antoine Arthur Gris in 1865. In 1871 Brogniart and Gris placed in the monotypic genus Garnieria as Garnieria spathulifolia. Molecular phylogenetic studies indicated that it is nested in the larger Australian genus Persoonia, and in 2023 was renamed Persoonia spathulifolia by Yohan Pillon.
