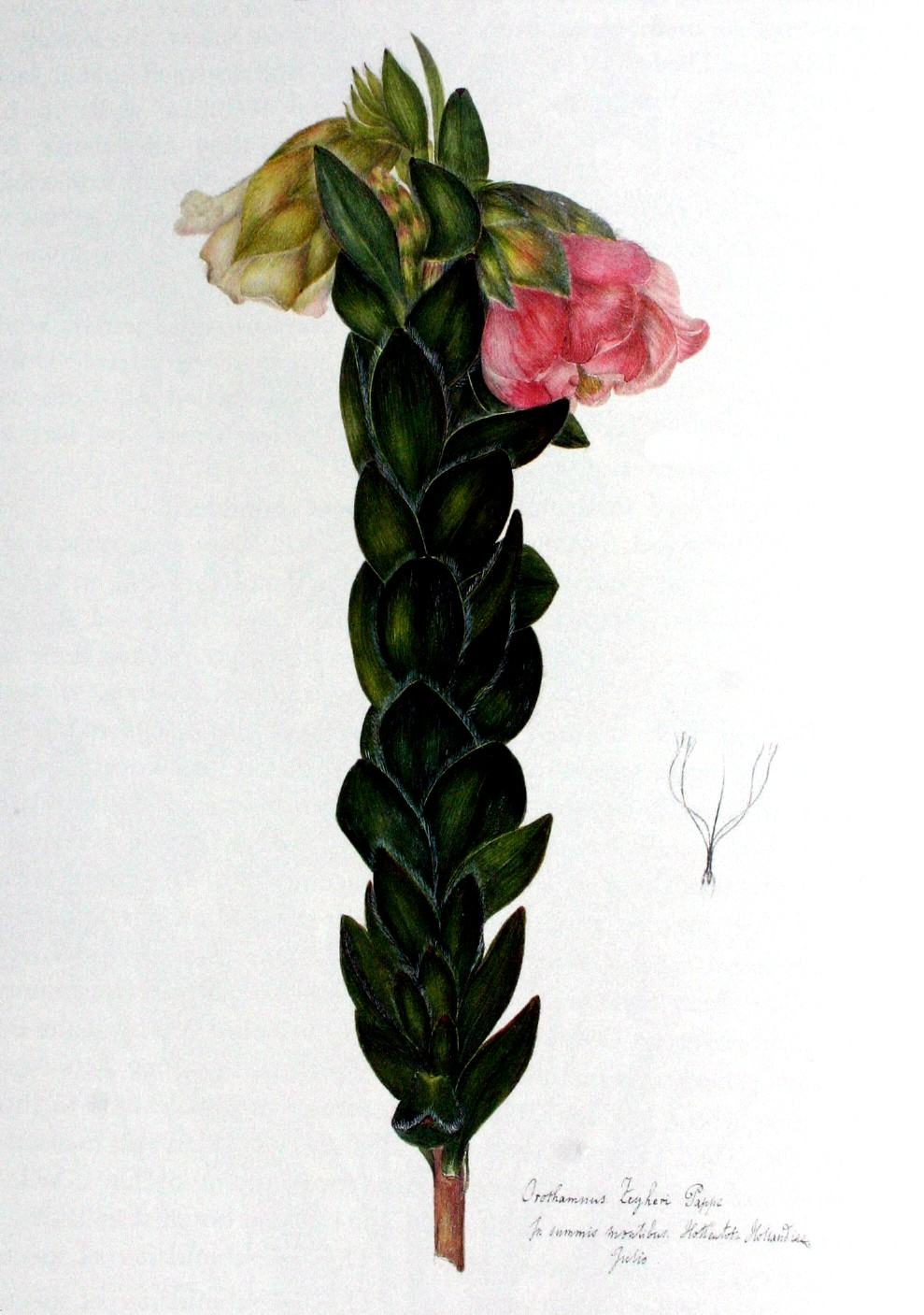
- Orothamnus zeyheri Pappe ex Hook. Watercolour by Jean Villet (1817–1877)

Conservation status
- Vulnerable (IUCN 3.1)

Scientific classification
- Kingdom: Plantae
- Clade: Embryophytes
- Clade: Tracheophytes
- Clade: Angiosperms
- Clade: Eudicots
- Order: Proteales
- Family: Proteaceae
- Subfamily: Proteoideae
- Tribe: Leucadendreae
- Subtribe: Leucadendrinae
- Genus: Orothamnus; Pappe ex Hook.
- Species: O. zeyheri

Binomial name
- Orothamnus zeyheri Pappe ex Hook.

= Orothamnus =

Genus of plants

Orothamnus (Greek 'oros' mountain, 'thamnos' bush) or marsh rose is a monotypic fynbos genus in the family Proteaceae occurring in the Kogelberg and Kleinrivier Mountains of Hottentots-Holland in the Western Cape Province of South Africa. It is an erect, sparsely branched shrub to 5 m (16 ft) tall and was first depicted by Jean Villet, a Capetonian artist and dealer in natural history specimens, in Curtis's Botanical Magazine 74: plate 4357 in 1848.

Orothamnus zeyheri (after the botanist Karl Ludwig Philipp Zeyher) is extremely rare and endangered and appears on CITES Appendix I. The plants are short-lived, with an average lifespan of 10 years and a maximum of 20 years, and are readily killed by fire. The seeds, on the other hand, are long-lived and remain viable for over 35 years below ground, where they are deposited by ants, and paradoxically need summer fires to germinate. The pollinating agent is not known. Marsh Roses grow in peaty swamps and seeps at altitudes of 450–850 m (1,480–2,790 ft). Seeds germinating at other times, suffer from low germination rates and predation by Saunders' Vlei Rat Otomys saundersiae, and if the soil around the plant is disturbed or trampled, then the oomycete Phytophthora causes death. Successful grafting onto Leucospermum rootstock, has given renewed hope that the species may yet be saved from extinction.

== References and links ==
- Protea Atlas Project
- CITES amendments
- Colin Paterson-Jones
- Kogelberg Nature Reserve
- Boucher, C.; McCann, G.D. The Orothamnus saga. Veld and Flora 61: 2–5; 1975.
