= Grevillea divaricata =

Conservation status
- Critically endangered, possibly extinct (IUCN 3.1)

Scientific classification
- Kingdom: Plantae
- Clade: Embryophytes
- Clade: Tracheophytes
- Clade: Spermatophytes
- Clade: Angiosperms
- Clade: Eudicots
- Order: Proteales
- Family: Proteaceae
- Genus: Grevillea
- Species: G. divaricata

Binomial name
- Grevillea divaricata R.Br.

Species of shrub native to New South Wales, Australia

Grevillea divaricata is a possibly extinct species of flowering plant in the family Proteaceae and is endemic to central New South Wales. It is a low shrub with linear leaves and small clusters of flowers on the ends of branchlets. It is only known from the type specimen, discovered in 1823. No live specimens have been found since then.

== Description ==
Grevillea divaricata is a shrub that typically grows to a height of up to about 40 cm (16 in) and sometimes forms a lignotuber. It has spreading, linear leaves, 8–13 mm (0.31–0.51 in) long and 0.5–0.6 mm (0.020–0.024 in) wide with the edges rolled under, obscuring the lower surface. The upper surface of the leaves is rough to the touch. The flowers are arranged on the ends of branches in loose clusters of up to four on a glabrous rachis 2–6 mm (0.079–0.236 in) long, the pistil about 16 mm (0.63 in) long. The flowers are probably red or red and cream-coloured. Flowering was recorded in April.

This grevillea is similar to G. rosmarinifolia but has spreading (rather than erect) leaves, rough (rather than mostly smooth) leaves, and sometimes forms a lignotuber (never present with G. rosmarinifolia).

== Taxonomy ==
Grevillea divaricata was first formally described in 1830 by Robert Brown in the Supplementum primum prodromi florae Novae Hollandiae from specimens collected by Allan Cunningham in mountains north of Bathurst in 1823. The specific epithet (divaricata) means "widely spreading".

== Distribution and habitat ==
Grevillea divaricata is only known from the type location north of Bathurst where it grew in open forest.

== Conservation status ==
Grevillea divaricata is listed as critically endangered, possibly extinct on the IUCN Red List. It is only known from the type specimen that was found north of Bathurst in 1823. Since then, no additional confirmed specimens have ever been found. This, along with the clearing of a vast majority of natural vegetation in the area it was discovered lead to the possibility that this species may be extinct, although there is insufficient evidence to determine the likelihood of extinction in this species.

If the species still exists, it likely persists in severely fragmented and small populations and would be threatened by habitat loss, grazing from livestock and feral herbivores and changed fire regimes. Only 3% of the natural vegetation within the known extent of occurrence remains. Assuming the species has not already gone extinct, it is highly susceptible to extinction via stochastic processes due to its presumed low population and restricted distribution.

This grevillea is also listed as "endangered" under the New South Wales Government Biodiversity Conservation Act 2016.
