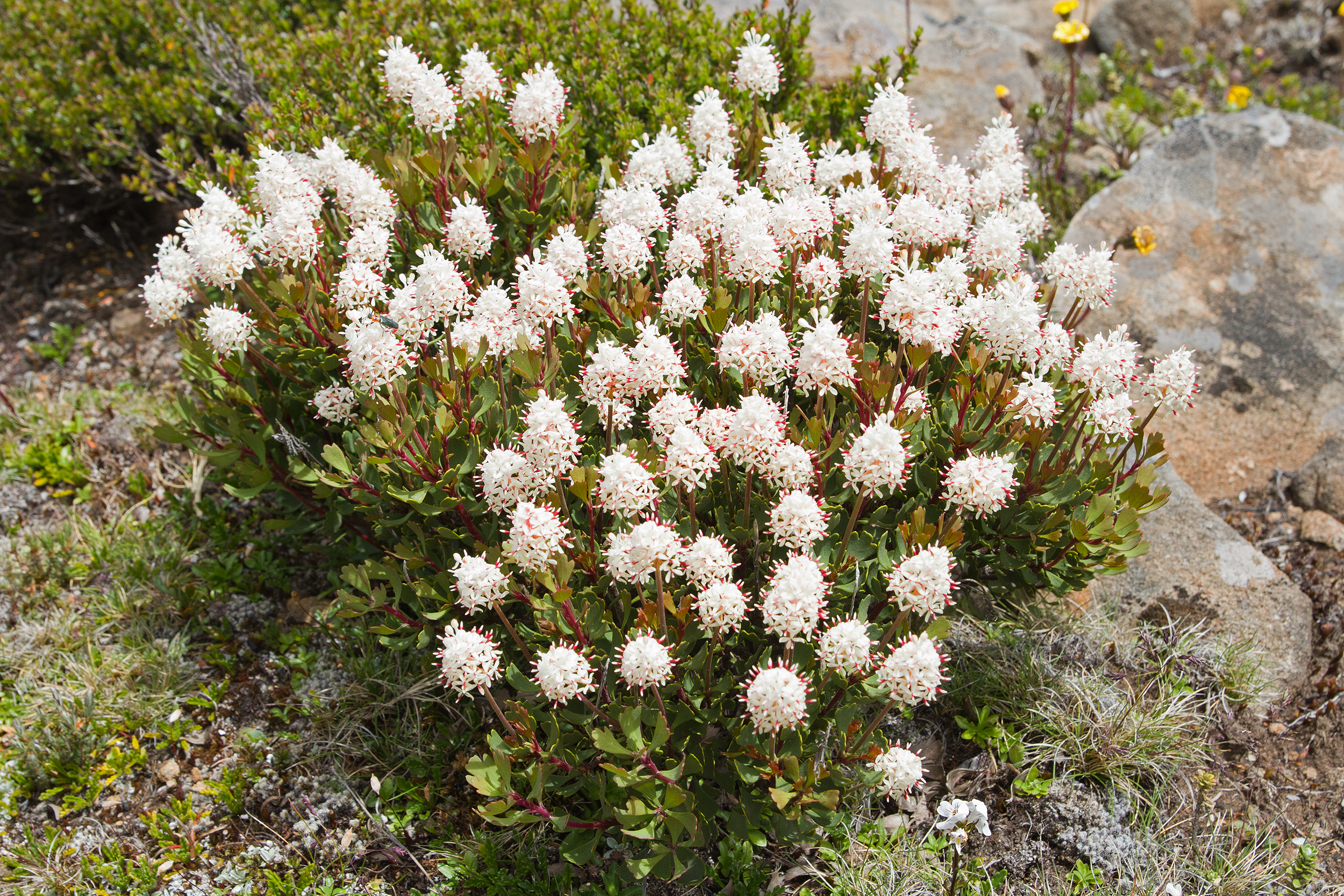
- Above: habit Below: detail of inflorescences
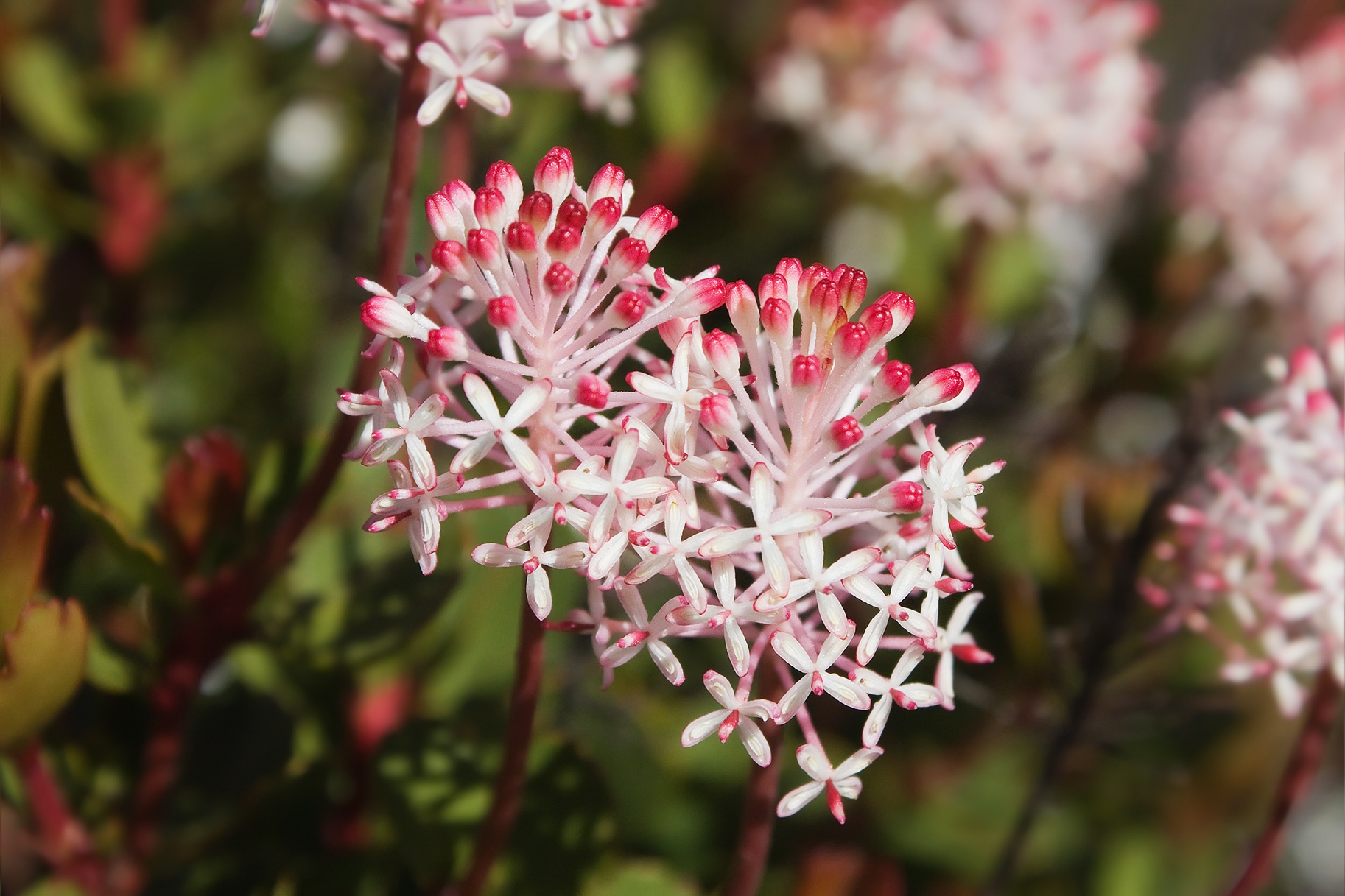

Conservation status
- Least Concern (IUCN 3.1)

Scientific classification
- Kingdom: Plantae
- Clade: Embryophytes
- Clade: Tracheophytes
- Clade: Angiosperms
- Clade: Eudicots
- Order: Proteales
- Family: Proteaceae
- Subfamily: Bellendenoideae; P.H.Weston
- Genus: Bellendena; R.Br.
- Species: B. montana

Binomial name
- Bellendena montana R.Br.

= Bellendena =

Genus of plants endemic to Australia

Bellendena montana, commonly known as mountain rocket, is a species of low-growing multi-stemmed shrub in the plant family Proteaceae. It is endemic to high-altitude subalpine and alpine regions in Tasmania, Australia. The prominent white flower spikes appear over summer, followed by small bright red or yellow fruit in late summer and autumn.

Described by Robert Brown in 1810, it is the sole member of the genus Bellendena, which is in turn the sole member of subfamily Bellendenoideae, and is thought to represent an early offshoot within the family.

== Taxonomy ==
Scottish botanist Robert Brown described the mountain rocket in 1810 as Bellendena montana, naming the genus in honour of John Bellenden Ker Gawler for his botanical works. The species name is the Latin adjective montanus and refers to its montane habitat. Its common name refers to its red-tipped rocket-shaped flowerheads.

Phylogenetic studies often place this genus as basal (one of the earliest offshoots) to the rest of the Proteaceae, though its exact position and relationships are unclear. A 2006 analysis, synthesizing molecular and other studies, by Weston and Barker located it as sister to the subfamily Persoonioideae, the two sharing a common ancestor which diverged from the other Proteaceae. However, the genus has an anatomical feature, laterocytic stomata (having 3 or more parallel specialised subsidiary cells), which it shares with the Platanaceae (next closest relatives to the Proteaceae) and no other Proteaceae, which indicate it diverged from all other members of the family first.

== Description ==
Bellendena montana grows as a low, spreading multistemmed shrub to anywhere from 10 cm (3.9 in) to 1.8 m (5 ft 11 in) high, and 1 m (3 ft 3 in) in diameter. The leaves are thick and variable, ranging from oblanceolate to spathulate to wedge-shaped (cuneate) in shape with recurved margins and measuring 1–6 cm (0.4–2.4 in) long and 0.2–2.2 cm (0.08–0.87 in) wide. Plants from north-eastern Tasmania have narrower leaves than elsewhere, and populations from higher altitudes have smaller leaves and more crowded foliage. The flowers occur in terminal racemes which are held on short stems above the foliage. These are followed by small egg-shaped (obovate) bright red or yellow fruit, which are ripe in late summer and autumn.

== Distribution and habitat ==
Bellendena montana is found at altitudes above 1000 m (3500 ft), though rarely lower to 400 m (1,300 ft). It grows on low-nutrient soils (mostly dolerite, but sometimes quartzite or basalt-derived) with good drainage, often rocky outcrops, as well as more boggy areas and alpine heathland. It is locally abundant and not considered to be threatened.

== Cultivation ==
The plant has attractive flowers, fruit and foliage, but is not often cultivated because it is difficult to grow at low altitudes. Propagation by seed or cutting is unreliable.
