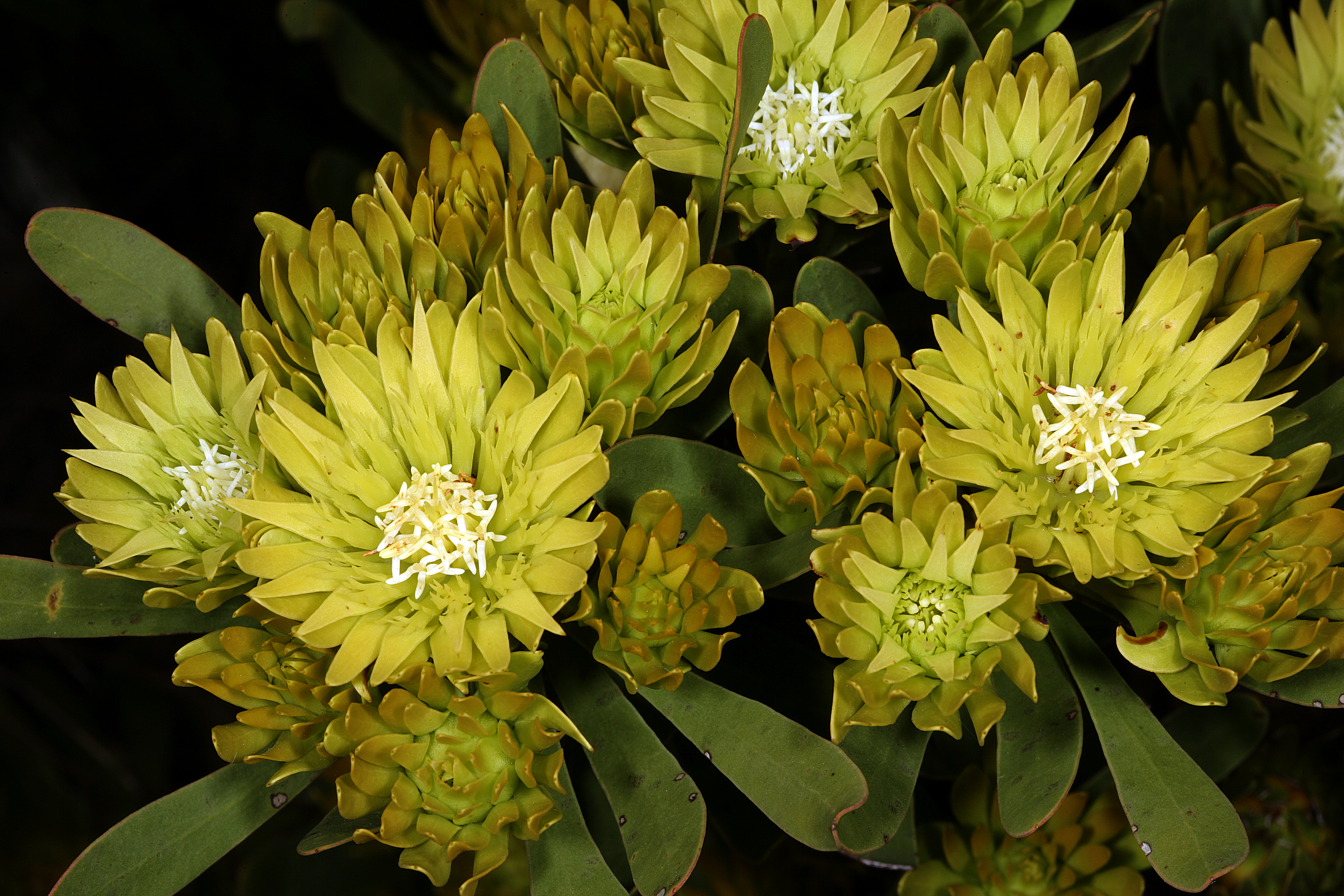
- Aulax umbellata female plant with pistillate flowers

Scientific classification
- Kingdom: Plantae
- Clade: Embryophytes
- Clade: Tracheophytes
- Clade: Angiosperms
- Clade: Eudicots
- Order: Proteales
- Family: Proteaceae
- Subfamily: Proteoideae
- Tribe: Petrophileae
- Genus: Aulax; Berg., 1767

Species
- See text

= Aulax =

Genus of evergreen shrubs

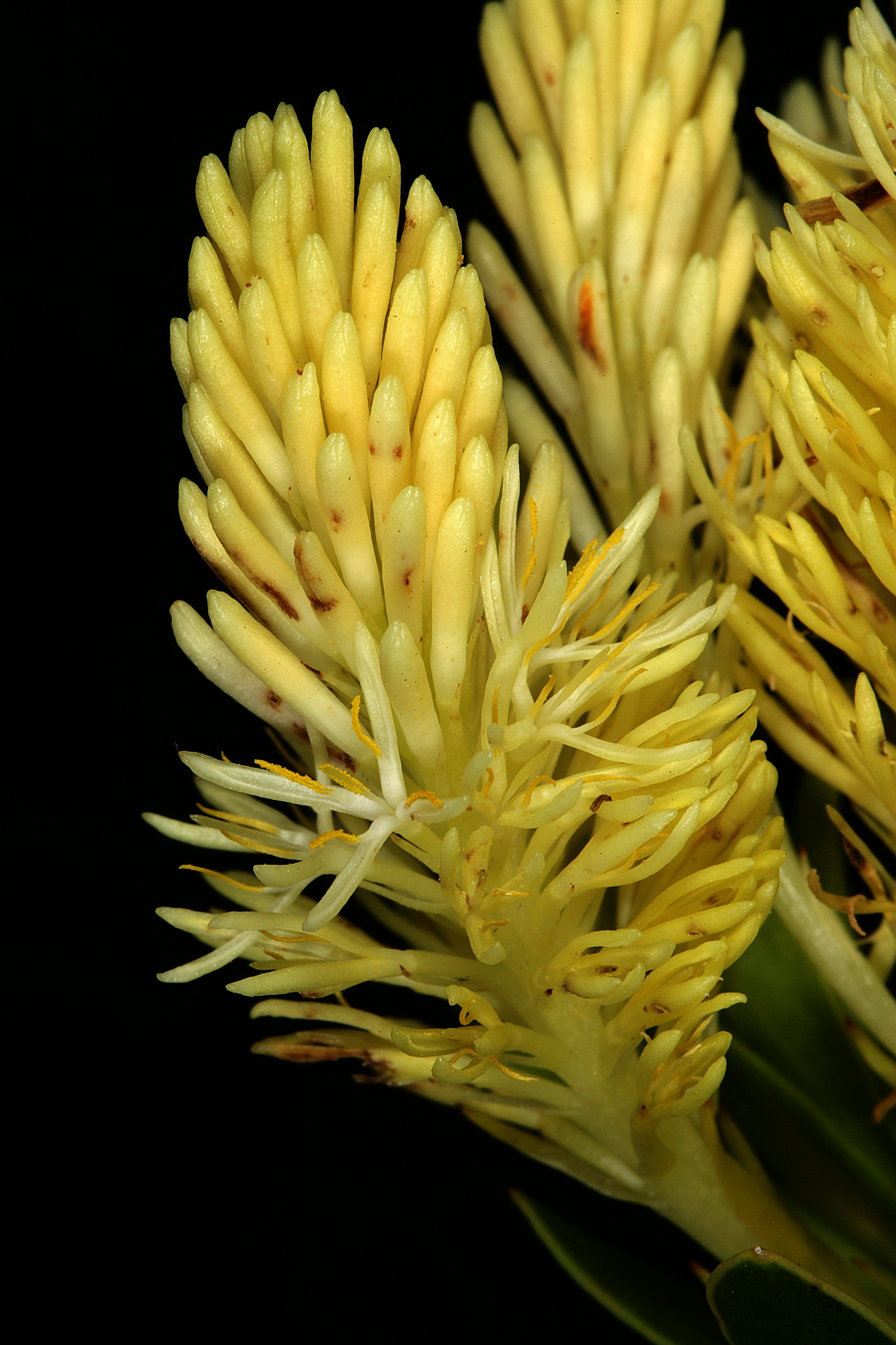
Aulax umbellata male plant with staminate flowers

Aulax is a South African Proteaceae genus of just three species of evergreen shrubs commonly known as "featherbushes". It is unusual among the many South African Proteaceae in having male and female flowers on separate plants. The bushes have fine needle-like foliage. In spring and summer female plants produce funnel-shaped Leucospermum-like flowerheads that develop into seed cones. The catkin-like male flowers are yellow.

== Species ==
Described species are listed below:

- Aulax cancellata (L.) Druce, 1753, 1914 – Channel-leaf featherbush
- Aulax pallasia Stapf, 1912 – Needle-leaf featherbush
- Aulax umbellata (Thunb.) R.Br., 1781, 1810 – Broad-leaf or fluffy featherbush

== Cultivation ==
In all respects except frost hardiness, these are tough plants. They tolerate extreme heat, very low humidity, and prolonged drought. Like virtually all Proteaceae plants, they grow best on a light gritty soil with good drainage. They propagate from seed or half-hardened late summer-autumn cuttings.
