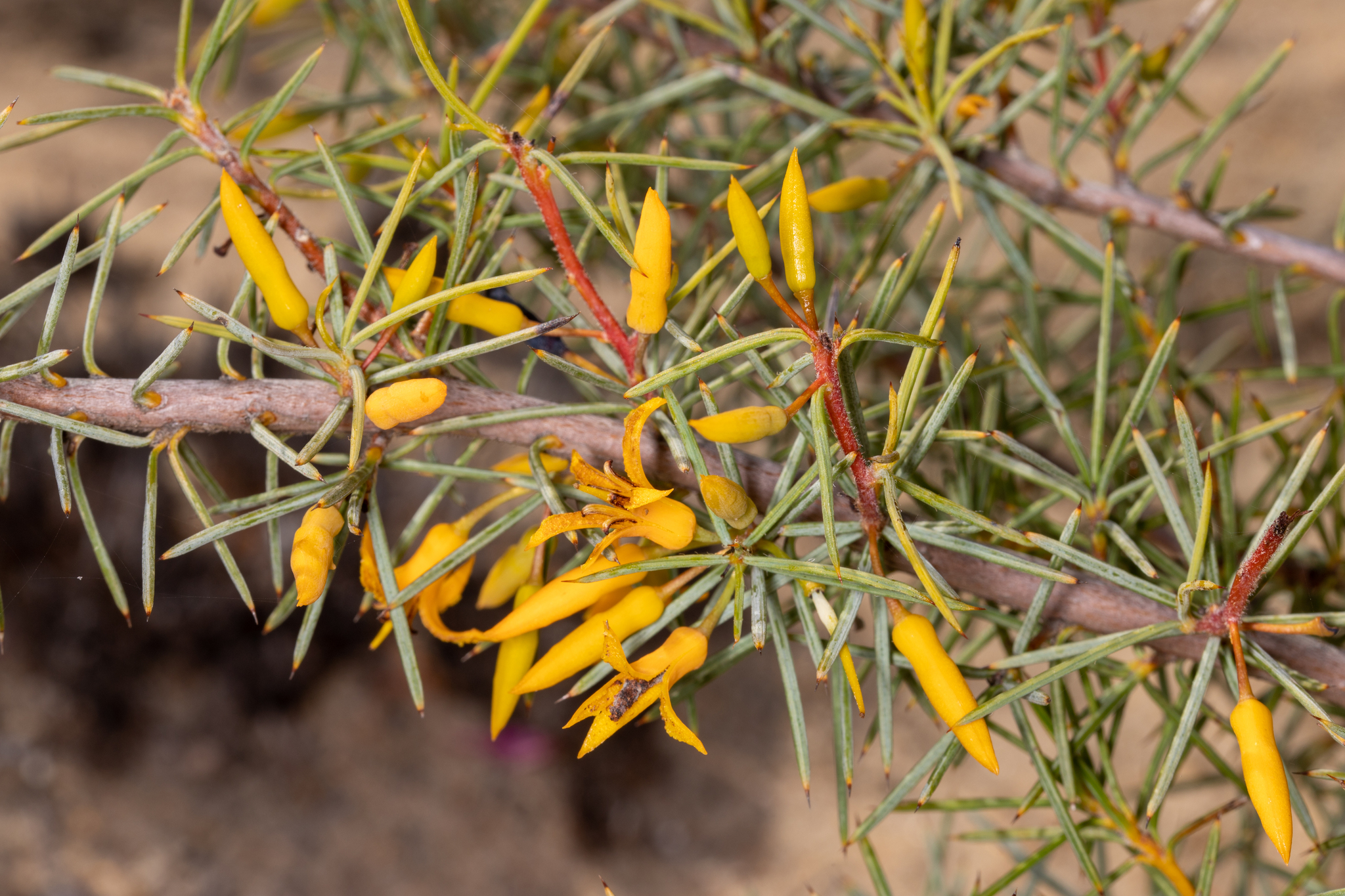

Scientific classification
- Kingdom: Plantae
- Clade: Tracheophytes
- Clade: Angiosperms
- Clade: Eudicots
- Order: Proteales
- Family: Proteaceae
- Genus: Persoonia
- Species: P. acicularis

Binomial name
- Persoonia acicularis F.Muell.
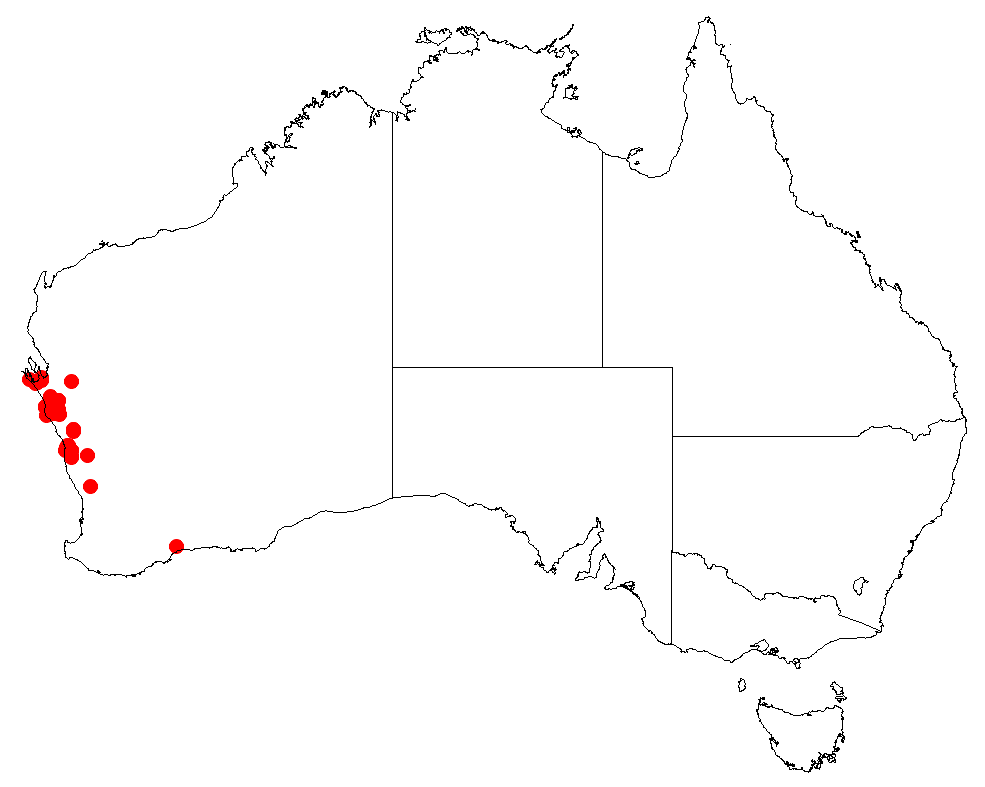
- Occurrence data downloaded from AVH

Synonyms
- Linkia acicularis (F.Muell.) Kuntze

= Persoonia acicularis =

Species of flowering plant

Persoonia acicularis is a species of flowering plant in the family Proteaceae and is endemic to the west coast of Western Australia. It is a shrub with linear, sharply-pointed leaves and yellow flowers in groups of up to eighty.

== Description ==
Persoonia acicularis is a shrub that typically grows to a height of 0.1–1.2 m (3.9 in – 3 ft 11.2 in) with young branchlets covered with greyish hairs. The leaves are linear, more or less cylindrical, 12–25 mm (0.47–0.98 in) long and 0.6–1 mm (0.024–0.039 in) wide and sharply pointed. Yellow, cylindrical flowers are borne in groups of up to eighty along up to 120 mm (4.7 in) of the stems, each flower 8.5–15.5 mm (0.33–0.61 in) long on a pedicel 3–10 mm (0.12–0.39 in) long.

== Taxonomy and naming ==
Persoonia acicularis was first formally described in 1868 by Ferdinand von Mueller in his book Fragmenta Phytographiae Australiae from specimens collected by Augustus Frederick Oldfield near the Murchison River. The specific epithet, acicularis, is derived from Latin and means "needle-shaped".

== Distribution and habitat ==
This persoonia grows in heath in near-coastal areas of Western Australia between Shark Bay and the Arrowsmith River in the Geraldton Sandplains and Yalgoo bioigeographic regions.

== Conservation status ==
Persoonia acicularis is classified as "not threatened" by the Government of Western Australia Department of Parks and Wildlife.
