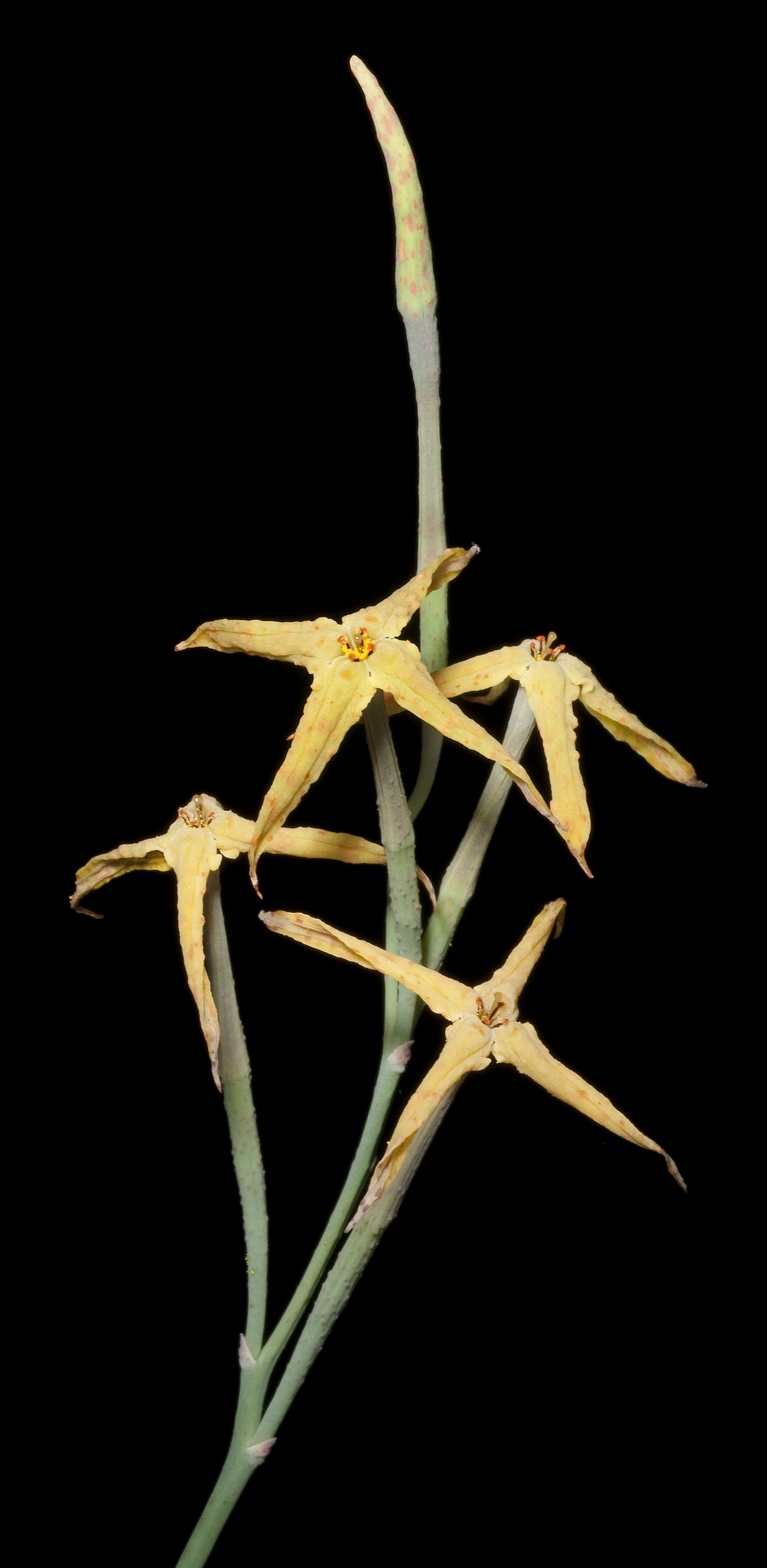
- Franklandia fucifolia

Scientific classification
- Kingdom: Plantae
- Clade: Tracheophytes
- Clade: Angiosperms
- Clade: Eudicots
- Order: Proteales
- Family: Proteaceae
- Subfamily: Proteoideae
- Genus: Franklandia; R.Br.

= Franklandia =

Genus of small shrubs endemic to Australia

Franklandia is a genus of small shrubs in the family Proteaceae, commonly known as lanolin bushes. It is endemic to Southwest Australia.

== Description ==
Franklandias are heathland shrubs found on white or grey sands. They possess a lignotuber, allowing them to recover from bushfire. Several erect branches emerge from an upright stem. The flowers are medium to large and composed of four parts, the colour of which may by creamy, white, golden or red. The appearance of the outer parts is petal-like. Several of these are arranged in racemes on an elongated scape. The anthers are found within the floral tube, distinguishing the genus from many other Proteaceae. The foliage is fleshy or leathery, glabrous, large, bluish green leaves whose structure is narrow and tapering, it repeatedly bifurcates at the tip. The cavities of the leaves give a rough appearance.

== Species ==
A description of Franklandia fucifolia was published in Robert Brown's 1810 paper On the Proteaceae of Jussieu, naming the genus after the botanist Thomas Frankland. Brown collected flowering specimens and seeds "In moist heaths near the shores" of King George Sound in 1801. The distribution of the species is recorded in the southern regions of the botanical province, along the coast to the eastern Esperance Plains. This species is sometimes found on sand over laterite. The height is between 30 cm (12 in) to 1.3 metres (4 ft 3 in). The long flowering period is from January to October.

A second species, Franklandia triaristata, was described by George Bentham in 1870. This is a rarer population, recorded in a smaller distribution range at the south-western corner of the state. A smaller shrub than F. fucifolia, up to a metre in height, the shorter flowering period is from August to October.
