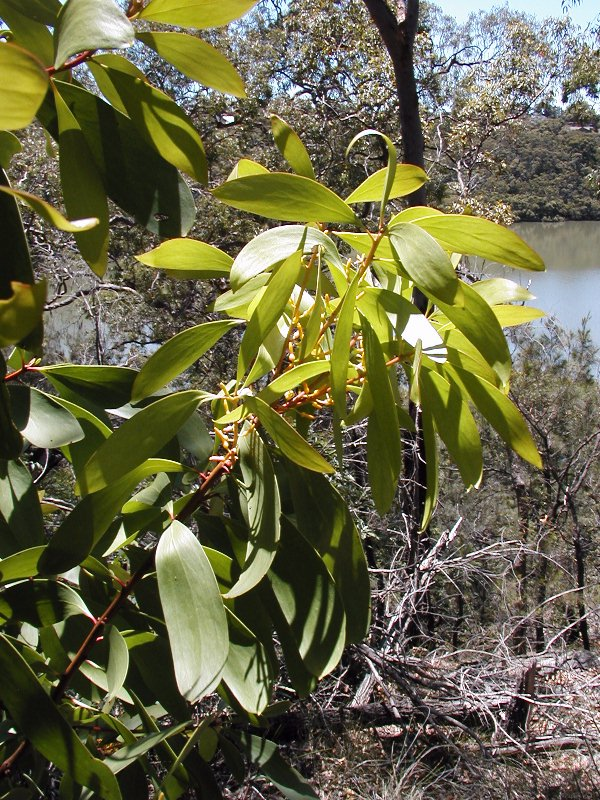
- Persoonia levis

Scientific classification
- Kingdom: Plantae
- Clade: Embryophytes
- Clade: Tracheophytes
- Clade: Angiosperms
- Clade: Eudicots
- Order: Proteales
- Family: Proteaceae
- Subfamily: Persoonioideae; L.A.S.Johnson & B.G.Briggs

Genera
- Persoonia; Acidonia; Garnieria; Toronia; Placospermum

= Persoonioideae =

Subfamily of plants

The Persoonioideae are a subfamily of closely related genera within the large and diverse family Proteaceae and incorporates such genera as Persoonia, Acidonia, Garnieria, Toronia and Placospermum.

Like most Proteaceae, the great majority of species of Persoonioideae are plants of well-drained, acid, siliceous soils that are low in nutrients. Two species from south western Australia (Acidonia microcarpa, Persoonia graminea) grow in swampy habitats, three others (P. acicularis, P. bowgada and P. hexagona) tolerate mildly calcareous soils, and several south eastern species sometimes grow on basalt-derived soils, but these are exceptional. The greatest diversity of species is found in areas with soils derived from sandstones and granites.

Placospermum coriaceum is the only species of Persoonioideae that usually completes its entire life cycle in rainforests. The others are basically plants of the shrubby strata of heathlands, and sclerophyll forests and woodlands. However, some species, such as Persoonia arborea, P. media and P. amaliae, occasionally find themselves surrounded by rainforests that have replaced the sclerophyll communities in which the plants germinated.
