= On the Proteaceae =

1975 paper by Lawrie Johnson and Barbara Briggs

On the Proteaceae: The Evolution and Classification of a Southern Family is a highly influential monograph on the evolution, biogeography and taxonomy of the flowering plant family Proteaceae. Authored by Lawrie Johnson and Barbara Briggs, it appeared in Volume 70 of Botanical Journal of the Linnean Society in 1975. Johnson and Briggs had presented what would become the paper at a meeting of the Linnaean Society on 6 December 1973 amid celebrations of 200 years since the birth of Robert Brown.

One of its most important and long-lasting contributions was the establishment for a suprageneric classification of the Proteaceae, which was accepted with only minor modifications until 2006, when Peter H. Weston and Nigel P. Barker presented a new arrangement based primarily upon molecular data. According to Weston and Barker, "Johnson and Briggs' classification has served as the systematic framework for a generation of researchers".
