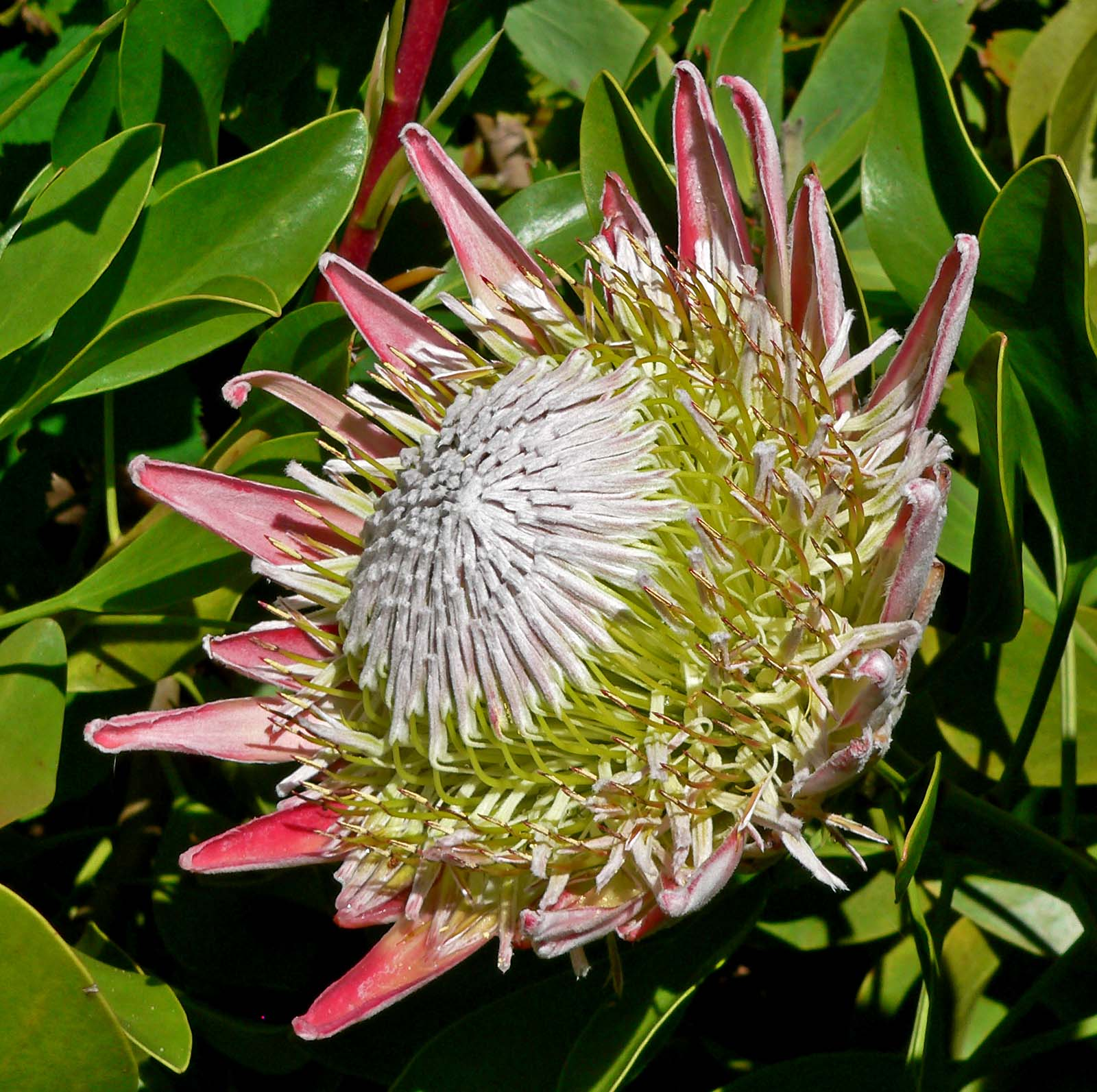
- Inflorescence of Protea cynaroides

Scientific classification
- Kingdom: Plantae
- Clade: Tracheophytes
- Clade: Angiosperms
- Clade: Eudicots
- Order: Proteales
- Family: Proteaceae; Juss.

Genera
- About 80, see text

= Proteaceae =

Proteaceae Temporal range: Cenomanian–recent

Family of flowering plants

The Proteaceae /ˌproʊtiˈeɪsiː/ form a family of flowering plants predominantly distributed in the Southern Hemisphere. The family comprises 83 genera with about 1,660 known species. Australia and South Africa have the greatest concentrations of diversity. Together with the Platanaceae (plane trees), Nelumbonaceae (the sacred lotus) and in the recent APG IV system the Sabiaceae, they make up the order Proteales. Well-known Proteaceae genera include Protea, Banksia, Embothrium, Grevillea, Hakea, and Macadamia. Species such as the New South Wales waratah (Telopea speciosissima), king protea (Protea cynaroides), and various species of Banksia, Grevillea, and Leucadendron are popular cut flowers. The nuts of Macadamia integrifolia are widely grown commercially and consumed, as are those of Gevuina avellana on a smaller scale.

== Etymology ==
The name Proteaceae was adapted by Robert Brown from the name Proteae coined in 1789 for the family by Antoine Laurent de Jussieu, based on the genus Protea, which in 1767, Carl Linnaeus derived from the name of the Greek god Proteus, a deity who was able to change between many forms.

== Taxonomy ==
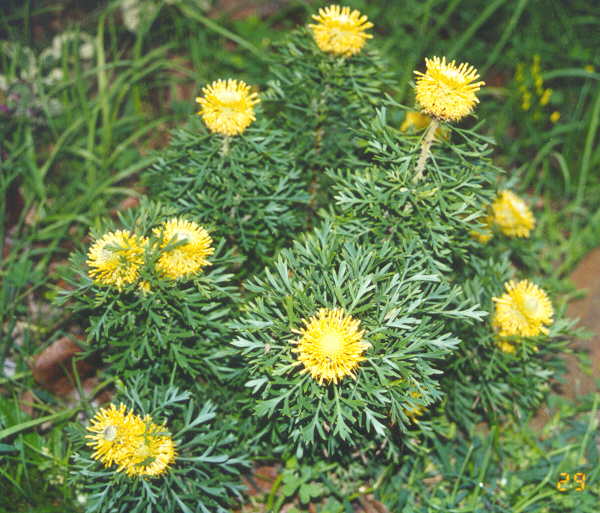
Isopogon anemonifolius

First described by French botanist Antoine Laurent de Jussieu, the family Proteaceae is a fairly large one, with around 80 genera, but less than 2,000 species. It is recognised by virtually all taxonomists. Firmly established under classical Linnaean taxonomy, it is also recognised by the cladistics-based APG and APG II systems. It is placed in the order Proteales, whose placement has itself varied.

A classification of the genera within Proteaceae was made by Lawrie Johnson and Barbara Briggs in their influential 1975 monograph "On the Proteaceae: the evolution and classification of a southern family", until it was largely superseded by the molecular studies of Peter H. Weston and Nigel Barker in 2006. Proteaceae are now divided into five subfamilies: Bellendenoideae, Persoonioideae, Symphionematoideae, Proteoideae and Grevilleoideae. In 2008 Mast and colleagues updated Macadamia and related genera in tribe Macadamieae. Furthermore, Orites megacarpus was found not to be within the genus Orites, nor in the tribe Roupaleae, instead in the tribe Macadamieae, hence given the new species name Nothorites megacarpus. The full arrangement, according to Weston and Barker (2006) with the updates to genera from Mast et al. (2008), is as follows:

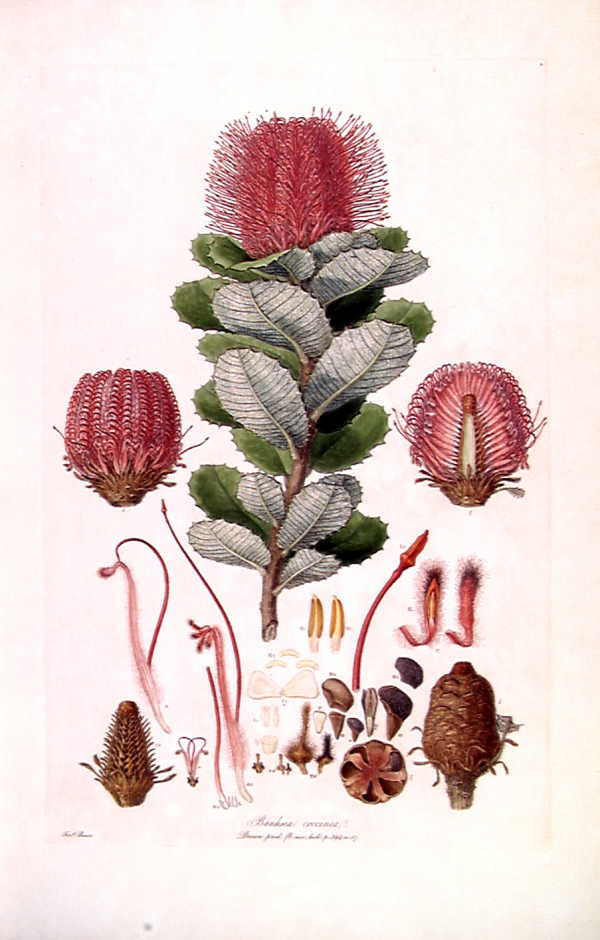
Flowers, leaves and fruit of Banksia coccinea, from Ferdinand Bauer's 1813 flora Illustrationes Florae Novae Hollandiae

Family Proteaceae

Subfamily Bellendenoideae

Bellendena

Subfamily Persoonioideae

Tribe Placospermeae

Placospermum

Tribe Persoonieae

Persoonia

Subfamily Symphionematoideae

Agastachys — Symphionema

Subfamily Proteoideae

incertae sedis

Eidothea — Beauprea — Beaupreopsis — Dilobeia — Cenarrhenes — Franklandia

Tribe Conospermeae

Subtribe Stirlingiinae

Stirlingia

Subtribe Conosperminae

Conospermum — Synaphea

Tribe Petrophileae

Petrophile — Aulax

Tribe Proteeae

Protea — Faurea

Tribe Leucadendreae

Subtribe Isopogoninae

Isopogon

Subtribe Adenanthinae

Adenanthos

Subtribe Leucadendrinae

Leucadendron — Serruria — Paranomus — Vexatorella — Sorocephalus — Spatalla — Leucospermum — Mimetes — Diastella — Orothamnus

Subfamily Grevilleoideae

incertae sedis

Sphalmium — Carnarvonia

Tribe Roupaleae

incertae sedis

Megahertzia — Knightia — Eucarpha — Triunia

Subtribe Roupalinae

Roupala — Neorites — Orites

Subtribe Lambertiinae

Lambertia — Xylomelum

Subtribe Heliciinae

Helicia — Hollandaea

Subtribe Floydiinae

Darlingia — Floydia

Tribe Banksieae

Subtribe Musgraveinae

Musgravea — Austromuellera

Subtribe Banksiinae

Banksia

Tribe Embothrieae

Subtribe Lomatiinae

Lomatia

Subtribe Embothriinae

Embothrium — Oreocallis — Alloxylon — Telopea

Subtribe Stenocarpinae

Stenocarpus — Strangea

Subtribe Hakeinae

Opisthiolepis — Buckinghamia — Hakea — Grevillea — Finschia

Tribe Macadamieae

Subtribe Macadamiinae

Macadamia — Lasjia — Nothorites — Panopsis — Brabejum

Subtribe Malagasiinae

Malagasia — Catalepidia

Subtribe Virotiinae

Virotia — Athertonia — Heliciopsis

Subtribe Gevuininae

Cardwellia — Euplassa — Gevuina — Bleasdalea — Hicksbeachia — Kermadecia

== Description ==
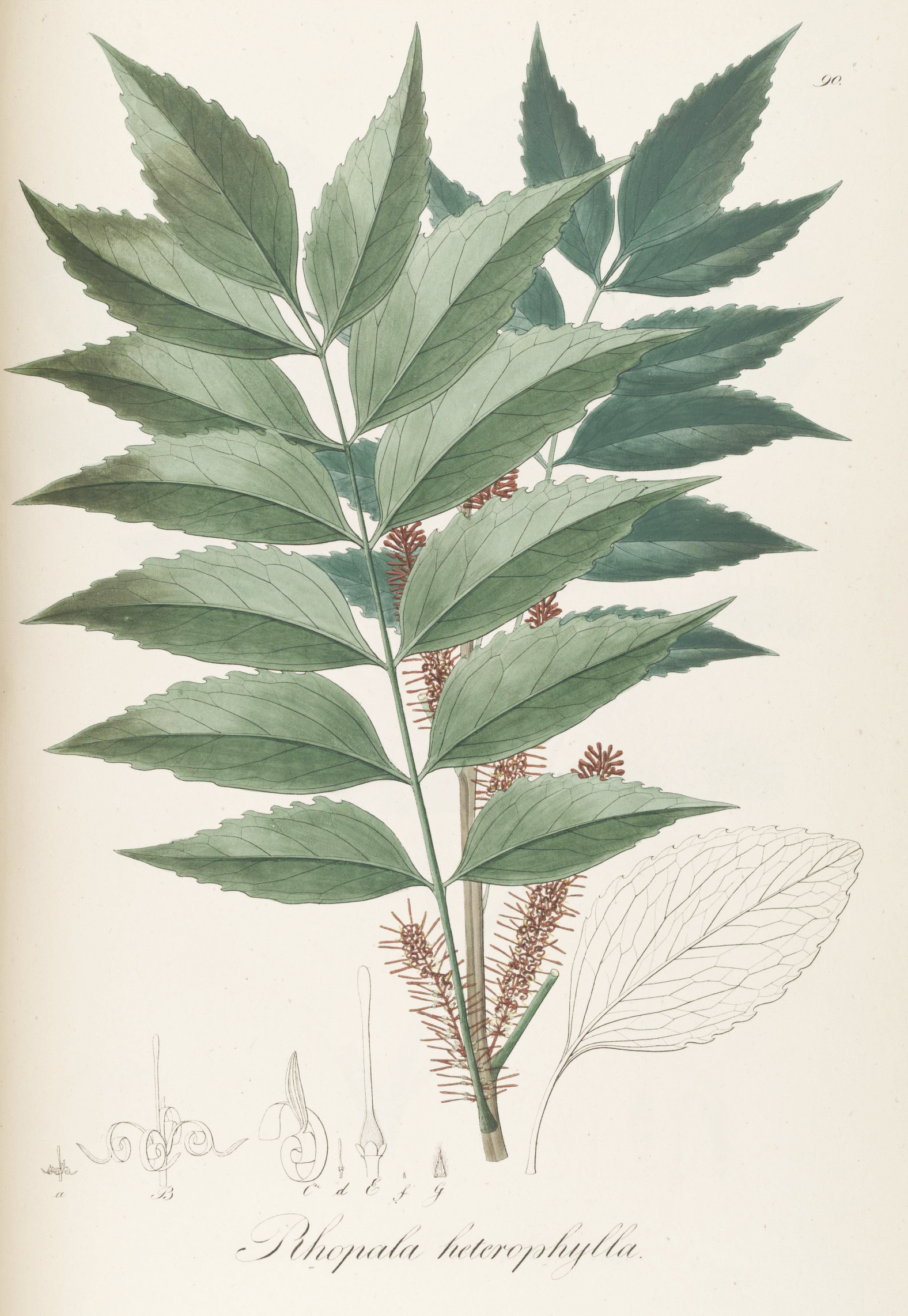
Rhopala heterophylla

The genera of Proteaceae are highly varied, with Banksia in particular providing a striking example of adaptive radiation in plants. This variability makes it impossible to provide a simple, diagnostic identification key for the family, although individual genera may be easily identified.

- Proteaceae range from prostrate shrubs to tall forest trees of 40 m (130 ft) in height, and are usually of medium height or low or perennial shrubs, except for some Stirlingia species that are herbs. Some species are facultatively deciduous (Embothrium coccineum), rarely acaulescent, the cauline portion of the collar is often thickened (lignotuber). Indumentum of three-celled hairs, sometimes glandular, rarely absent, the apical cell is usually elongated, acute, sometimes equally or unequally bifid.
- Leaves rarely aromatic, usually alternate, and in a spiral, rarely opposed, or verticilate; usually coriaceous, rarely fleshy or spinescent, simple or compound (imparipinnate, imparibipinate or rarely palmate or digitate with pinnatisect segments), entire edge to (3-)pinnatisect (giving a fern-like aspect); rarely divided dichotomously, often remotely toothed, crenate or serrated, seated or stalked; the petiole frequently with a swollen base but rarely sheathed (sometimes in Synaphea), without stipules; pinnate sometimes palmate or parallel venation, brochidodromous or reduced to a single prominent vein. Vernation normally conduplicate; anisophylly often occurs during the different growth periods. Leaf blade dorsiventral, bifacial or centric; mesophyll tissue usually with sclerenchymatous idioblasts, rare secretory cavities. Brachy-paracytic stomata (laterocytic in Bellendena).

Plant stems with two types of radii, wide and multi-serrated or narrow and uni-serrated, phloem stratified or not, trilacunar nodes with three leaf traces (rarely unilacunar with one trace), sclereids frequent; bark with lenticels frequently horizontally enlarged, cork cambium present, usually superficial. Roots lateral and short, often grouped in bundles (proteoid roots) with very dense root hairs, rarely with mycorrhiza.

- Plants usually hermaphroditic, more rarely monoecious, dioecious or andromonoecious.
- Inflorescences very variable, simple or compound, axillary or terminal, lateral flowers solitary or in pairs, rarely with a terminal flower, racemiform, paniculate or condensed, usually with bracts, sometimes converted into leaves or squamiform, forming a type of cone, or with bright colours, forming an involucre or pseudanthium, the peduncles and pedicels sometimes contracted, compacted with the rachis, in some cases the congested inflorescences form super inflorescences (some Alloxylon); very rarely the flowers are solitary and axillary near the end of branches; in species with lignotubers the flowers sometimes grow from these and pass through the soil (geophytes).
- Flowers are usually perfect, actinomorphic, or zygomorphic, hypogynous, frequently large and showy. Flat or oblique, sometimes forming a gynophore. Hypogynous disk present and extrastaminal or absent. Perianth of (3-)4(−8) tepals (sometimes interpreted as a dimerous and dichlamydeous perianth), in 1(−2) valvate whorls, sometimes elongated in a basal sack, free or fused in different ways (all fused or even one free and three basally to completely fused), or even connivent by marginally interdigitate papillae forming a tube or a bilabiate structure, zygomorphic, sometimes opening laterally in a variety of ways. Haplostemonous androecium, usually isostemonous, opposititepalous of (3-)4(−5) stamens, all fertile or some converted into staminodes, usually filamentous, filaments partially or totally fused to the tepals, rarely free, basifixed anthers adnate, ditheous, tetrasporangiate, sometimes unilocular and bisporagiate, introrse to latrorse (rarely), expanded connective, usually with apiculus, dehiscence along longitudinal tears. Hypogynous glands (0-)1–4, squamiform or elongated, fleshy, free or fused forming a lunate or annular nectary over the receptacle. Superior gynoecium of 1(−2) apocarpous carpels, sessile or stipitate (with a more or less elongated gynophore), sometimes not completely closed, style usually developed, stigma small or in the shape of a terminal or sub terminal disk or even lateral and oblique, often indented, papilous, moist or dry, ovules 1–100 or more per carpel, anatropous, hemianatropous, amphitropous or orthotropous, mostly hemitropous, bitegmic, crassinucellate, chalaza with a ring of vascular bundles, the funiculus is occasionally absent and the ovule is fused to the placenta, marginal placentation with various dispositions or apical.
- Fruit dehiscent or indehiscent, in achene or nucule, follicle, drupe (with lignified endocarp) or falsely drupal (with lignified internal mesocarp), sometimes similar to a caryopsis as it is fused to the wall of the ovary and the testa, often lignified and serotinous; the fruit from the same inflorescence are sometimes fused forming a syncarp.
- Seeds 1-many, sometimes winged, flat to rounded, with endosperm absent, present in Bellendina, endotesta with an unusual layer containing crystals of calcium oxalate that is rarely absent, well differentiated embryo, straight, dicotyledonous, but often with 3 or more (up to 9) large cotyledons, often auriculate.
- Pollen in monads, triangular in polar view, (2-)3(−8)-aperturate, usually isopolar and triporate, biporate in Embothrium and the tribe Banksieae, colpoidate in Beauprea, spherical in Aulax and Franklandia or strongly anisopolar in some species of Persoonia; the openings of the former's tetrads follow Garside's Law.
- Chromosomal number: n=5, 7, 10–14, 26, 28; sizes range from very small (average of 1,0 μm) to very big (average of 14,4 μm) according to species; x=7, 12.

== Flowers ==
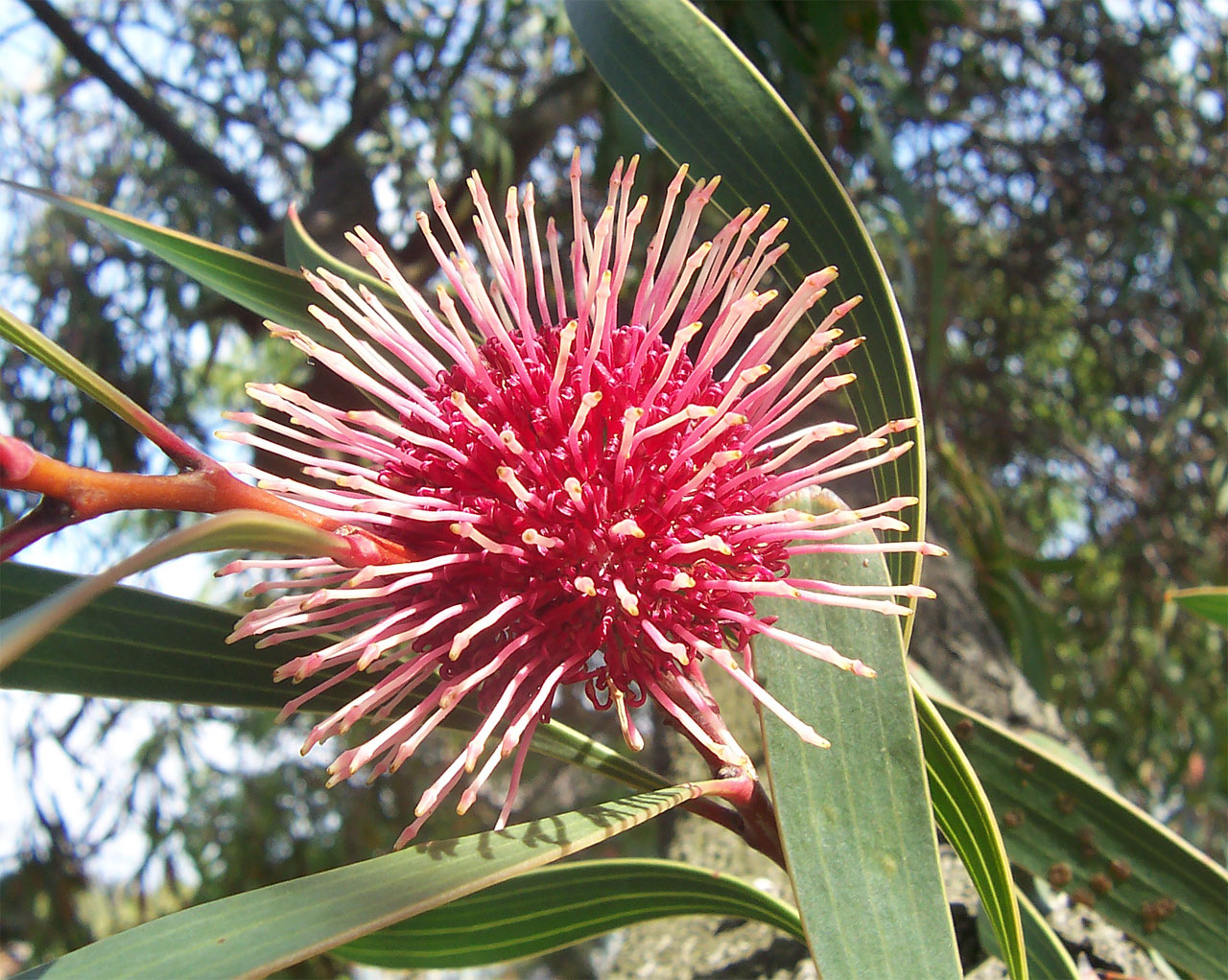
Inflorescence and leaves of the pin-cushion hakea (Hakea laurina)

Generally speaking, the diagnostic feature of Proteaceae is the compound pseudanthium. In many genera, the most obvious feature is the large and often very showy inflorescences, consisting of many small flowers densely packed into a compact head or spike. This character does not occur in all Proteaceae, however; Adenanthos species, for example, have solitary flowers. In most Proteaceae species, the pollination mechanism is highly specialised. It usually involves the use of a "pollen-presenter", an area on the style-end that presents the pollen to the pollinator.

Proteaceae flower parts occur in fours. The four tepals are fused into a long, narrow tube with a closed cup at the top, and the filaments of the four stamens are fused to the tepals in such a way that the anthers are enclosed within the cup. The pistil initially passes along the inside of the perianth tube, so the stigma, too, is enclosed within the cup. As the flower develops, the pistil grows rapidly. Since the stigma is trapped, the style must bend to elongate, and eventually it bends so far, the perianth is split along one seam. The style continues to grow until anthesis, when the nectaries begin to produce nectar. At this time, the perianth splits into its component tepals, the cup splits apart, and the pistil is released to spring more or less upright.

== Ecology ==
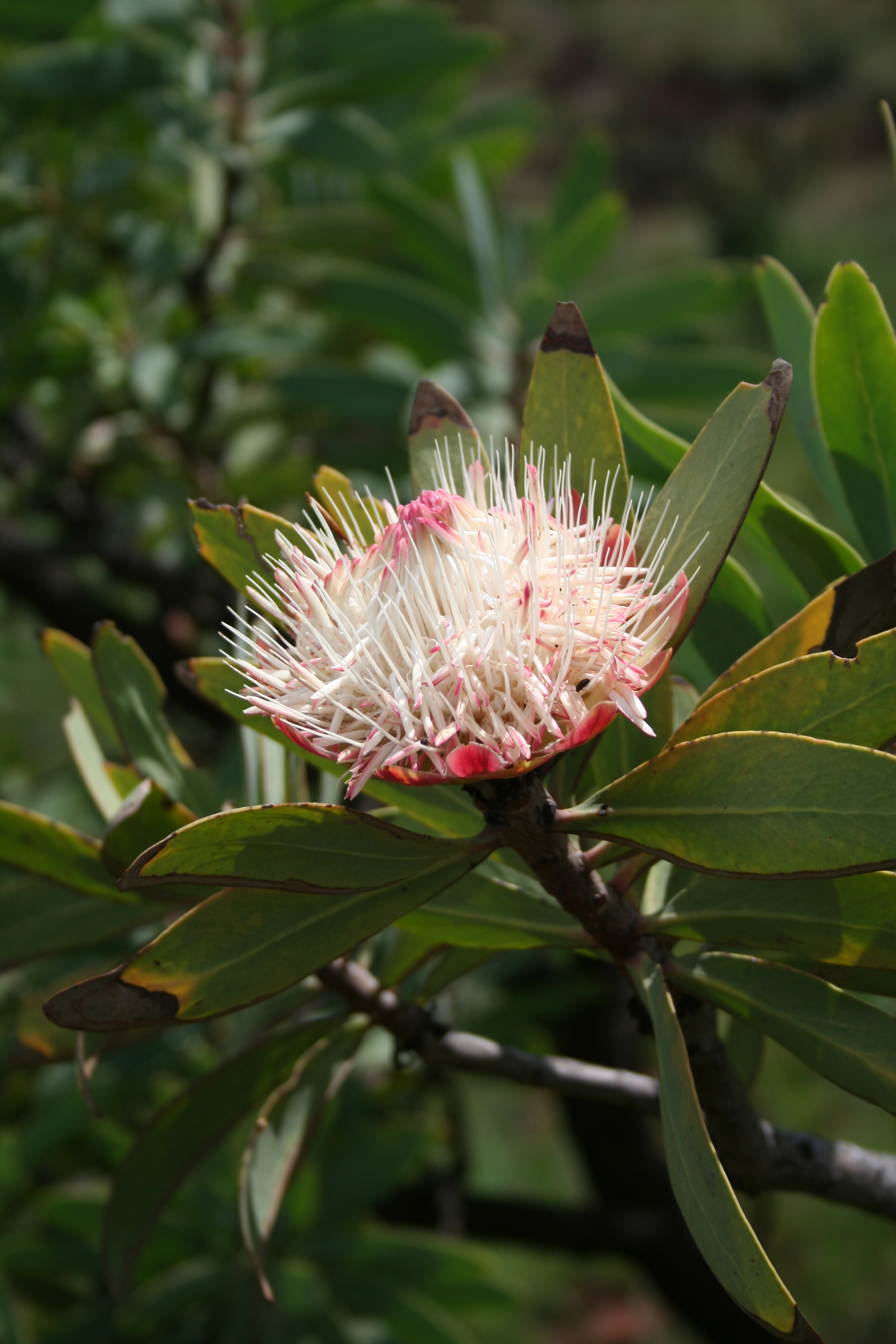
Inflorescence of Protea afra

Many of the Proteaceae have specialised proteoid roots, masses of lateral roots and hairs forming a radial absorptive surface, produced in the leaf litter layer during seasonal growth, and usually shrivelling at the end of the growth season. They are an adaptation to growth in poor, phosphorus-deficient soils, greatly increasing the plants' access to scarce water and nutrients by exuding carboxylates that mobilise previously unavailable phosphorus. They also increase the root's absorption surface, but this is a minor feature, as it also increases competition for nutrients against its own root clusters. However, this adaptation leaves them highly vulnerable to dieback caused by the Phytophthora cinnamomi water mould, and generally intolerant of fertilization. Due to these specialized proteoid roots, the Proteaceae are one of few flowering plant families that do not form symbioses with arbuscular mycorrhizal fungi. They exude large amounts of organic acids (citric acid and malic acid) every 2–3 days in order to aid the mobilization and absorption of phosphate. Many species are fire-adapted (pyrophytes), meaning they have strategies for surviving fires that sweep through their habitat. Some are resprouters, and have a thick rootstock buried in the ground that shoots up new stems after a fire, and others are reseeders, meaning the adult plants are killed by the fire, but disperse their seeds, which are stimulated by the smoke to take root and grow. The heat was previously thought to have stimulated growth, but the chemicals in the smoke have now been shown to cause it.

There are four dioecious genera (Aulax, Dilobeia, Heliciopsis and Leucadendron), 11 andromonoecious genera and some other genera have species that are cryptically andromonoecious: two species are sterile and only reproduce vegetatively (Lomatia tasmanica, Hakea pulvinifera). The species vary between being autocompatible and autoincompatible, with intermediate situations; these situations sometimes occur in the same species. The flowers are usually protandrous. Just before anthesis, the anthers release their pollen, depositing it onto the stigma, which in many cases has an enlarged fleshy area specifically for the deposition of its own pollen. Nectar-feeders are unlikely to come into contact with the anthers themselves, but can hardly avoid contacting the stigma; thus, the stigma functions as a pollen-presenter, ensuring the nectar-feeders act as pollinators. The downside of this pollination strategy is that the probability of self-fertilisation is greatly increased; many Proteaceae counter this with strategies such as protandry, self-incompatibility, or preferential abortion of selfed seed. The systems for presenting pollen are usually highly diverse, corresponding to the diversification of the pollinators. Pollination is carried out by bees, beetles, flies, moths, birds (honeyeaters, sunbirds, sugarbirds and hummingbirds) and mammals (rodents, small marsupials, elephant shrews and bats). The latter two means were evolutionarily derived from entomophily in different, independent events. The dispersion of some species exhibit serotiny, which is associated with their pyrophytic behaviour. These trees accumulate fruits on their branches whose outer layers or protective structures (bracts) are highly lignified and resistant to fire. The fruit only release their seeds when they have been burnt and when the ground has been fertilized with ashes from the fire and is free from competitors. Many species have seeds with elaiosomes that are dispersed by ants; the seeds with wings or thistledown exhibit anemochory, while the drupes and other fleshy fruit exhibit endozoochory as mammals and birds ingest them. Some African and Australian rodents are known to accumulate fruit and seeds of these plants in their nests in order to feed on them, although some manage to germinate.

== Distribution ==
Proteaceae are mainly a Southern Hemisphere family, with its main centres of diversity in Australia and South Africa. It also occurs in Central Africa, South and Central America, India, eastern and south eastern Asia, and Oceania. Only two species are known from New Zealand, although fossil pollen evidence suggests there were more previously.

It is a good example of a Gondwanan family, with taxa occurring on virtually every land mass considered a remnant of the ancient supercontinent Gondwana, except Antarctica. The family and subfamilies are thought to have diversified well before the fragmentation of Gondwana, implying all of them are well over 90 million years old. Evidence for this includes an abundance of proteaceous pollen found in the Cretaceous coal deposits of the South Island of New Zealand. It is thought to have achieved its present distribution largely by continental drift rather than dispersal across ocean gaps.

== Phytochemistry ==
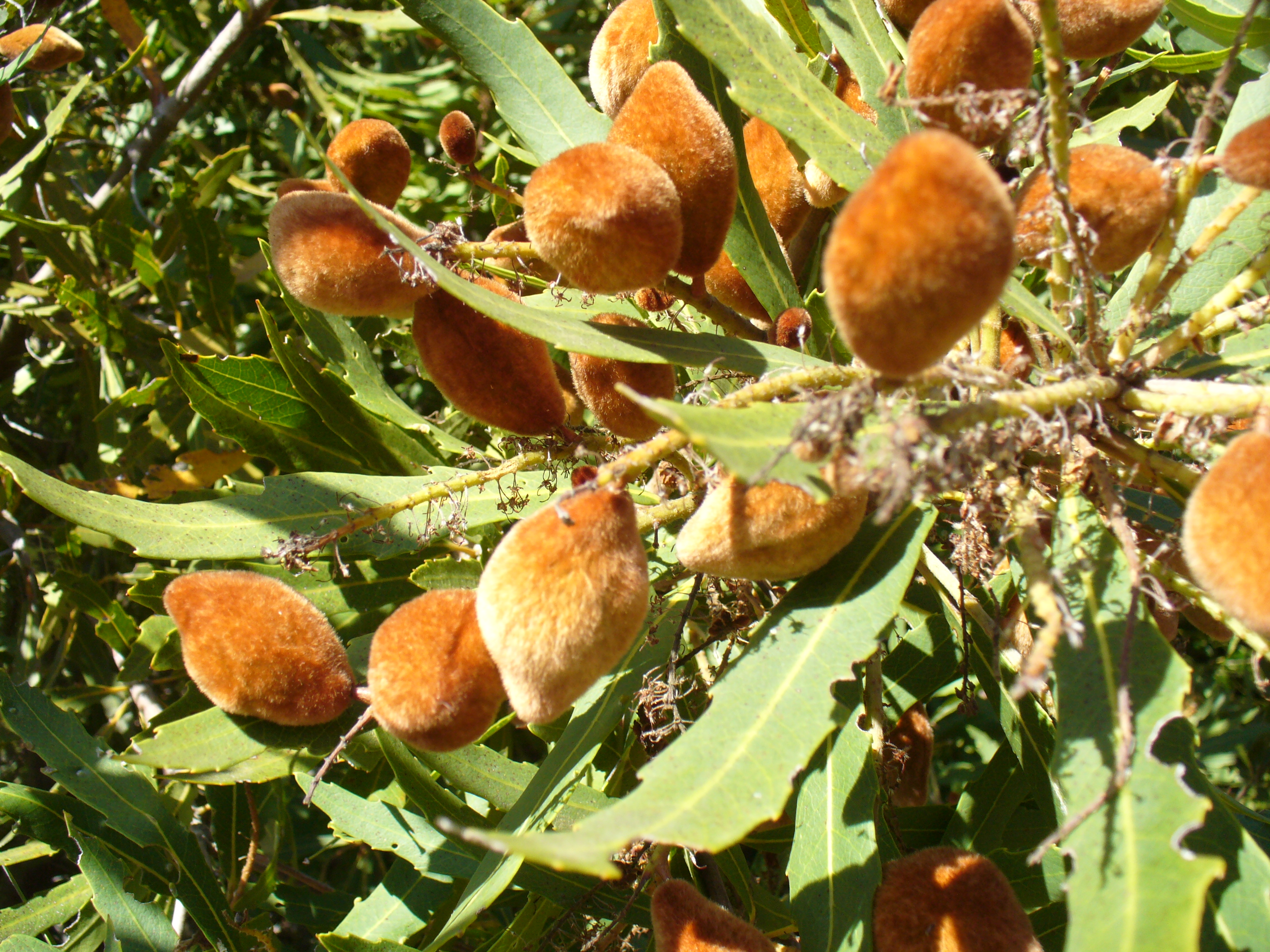
Fruit of Brabejum stellatifolium

No conclusive studies have been carried out on the chemical substances present in this broad family. The genera Protea and Faurea are unusual as they use xylose as the main sugar in their nectar and as they have high concentrations of polygalactol, while sucrose is the main sugar present in Grevillea. Cyanogenic glycosides, derived from tyrosine, are often present, as are proanthocyanidines (delphinidin and cyanidin), flavonols (kaempferol, quercetin and myricetin) and arbutin. Alkaloids are usually absent. Iridoids and ellagic acid are also absent. Saponins and sapogenins can be either present or absent in different species. Many species accumulate aluminium.

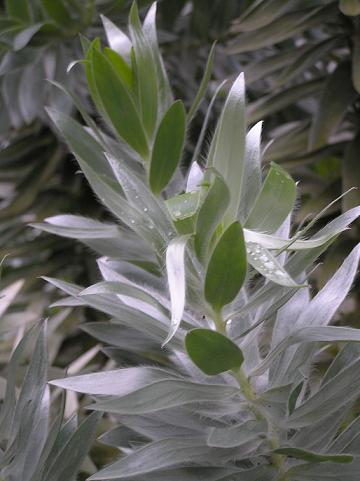
Leucadendron argenteum

== Uses and cultivation ==
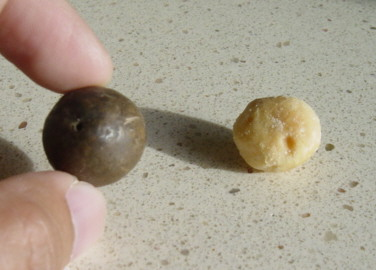
Edible nuts of Macadamia

Many traditional cultures have used Proteaceae as sustenance, medicine, for curing animal hides, as a source of dyes, firewood and as wood for construction. Aboriginal Australians eat the fruit of Persoonia, and the seeds of species from other genera, including Gevuina and Macadamia, form part of the diet of the indigenous peoples but are also sold throughout the world. The tender shoots of Helicia species are used in Java, and the nectar from the inflorescences of a number of species is drunk in Australia. Traditional medicines can be obtained from infusions of the roots, bark, leaves, or flowers of many species that are used as topical applications for skin conditions or internally as tonics, aphrodisiacs, and galactogens to treat headaches, cough, dysentery, diarrhea, indigestion, stomach ulcers, and kidney disease. The wood from the trees of this family is widely used in construction and for internal uses such as decoration; the wood from species of Protea, Leucadendron and Grevillea is especially popular. Many species are used in gardening, particularly genera of Banksia, Embothrium, Grevillea, and Telopea. This use has resulted in the introduction of exotic species that have become invasive; examples include the hakea willow (Hakea salicifolia) and the silky hakea (Hakea sericea) in Portugal.

Two species of Macadamia are cultivated commercially for their edible nuts. Gevuina avellana (Chilean hazel) is also cultivated for its edible nuts, in Chile and New Zealand, and they are also used in the pharmaceutical industry for their humectant properties and as an ingredient in sunscreens. It is the most cold-resistant of the tree families that produce nuts. It is also planted in the British Isles and on the Pacific coast of the United States for its tropical appearance and its ability to grow in cooler climates.

Many Proteaceae species are cultivated by the nursery industry as barrier plants and for their prominent and distinctive flowers and foliage. Some species are of importance to the cut flower industry, especially some Banksia and Protea species.

Sugarbushes (Protea), pincushions (Leucospermum) and conebushes (Leucadendron), as well as others like pagodas (Mimetes), Aulax and blushing brides (Serruria), comprise one of the three main plant groups of fynbos, which forms part of the Cape Floral Kingdom, the smallest but richest plant kingdom for its size and the only kingdom contained within a single country. The other main groups of plants in fynbos are the Ericaceae and the Restionaceae. South African proteas are thus widely cultivated due to their many varied forms and unusual flowers. They are popular in South Africa for their beauty and their usefulness in wildlife gardens for attracting birds and useful insects.

The species most valued as ornamentals are the trees that grow in southern latitudes as they give landscapes in temperate climates a tropical appearance; Lomatia ferruginea (Fuinque), Lomatia hirsuta (Radal) have been introduced in Western Europe and to the western United States. Embothrium coccineum (Chilean Firetree or Notro) is highly valued in the British Isles for its dark red flowers and can be found as far north as the Faroe Islands at a latitude of 62° north.

Among the banksias, many of which grow in temperate and Mediterranean climates, the vast majority are shrubs; only a few are trees that are valued for their height. Among the tallest species are: B. integrifolia with its subspecies B. integrifolia subsp. monticola, which is noteworthy as the plants that form the subspecies are the tallest trees of the banksias and they are more frost-resistant than other banksias, B. seminuda, B. littoralis, B. serrata; among those that can be considered small trees or large shrubs: B. grandis, B. prionotes, B. marginata, B. coccinea and B. speciosa; all of these are planted in parks and gardens and even along roadsides because of their size. The rest of the species of this genus, around 170 species, are shrubs, although some of them are valued for their flowers.

Another species that is cultivated in some parts of the world, although it is smaller, is Telopea speciosissima (Waratah), from the mountains of New South Wales, Australia.

Some temperate climate species are cultivated more locally in Australia for their attractive appearance: Persoonia pinifolia (pine-leaved geebung) is valued for its vivid yellow flowers and grape-like fruit. Adenanthos sericeus (woolly bush) is planted for its attractive soft leaves and its small red or orange flowers. Hicksbeachia pinnatifolia (beef nut, red bauple nut) is commonly planted for its foliage and edible nuts.

== Parasites ==
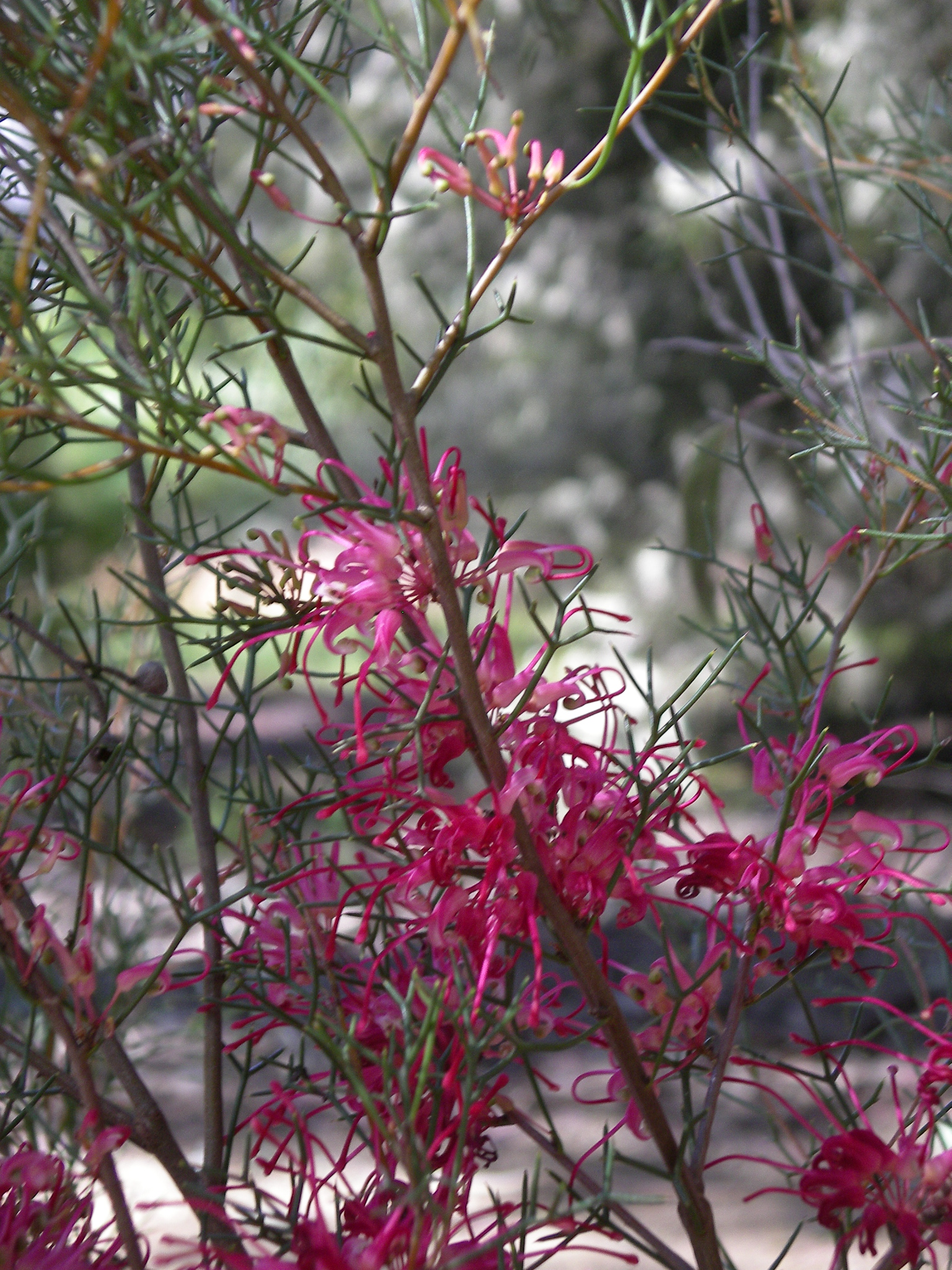
Hakea purpurea

The Proteaceae are particularly susceptible to certain parasites, in particular the oomycete Phytophthora cinnamomi, which causes severe root rot in the plants that grow in Mediterranean climates. Fusarium oxysporum causes a disease called fusariosis in roots that causes a yellowing and wilting, with serious ecological damages to woodland plants and economic losses in plants of commercial interest. Other common infections are caused by species of Botryosphaeria, Rhizoctonia, Armillaria, Botrytis, Calonectria and other fungi.

== Conservation status ==
As of the 2025-2 update, the International Union for Conservation of Nature has listed 1,549 Proteaceae species on the IUCN Red List, of which, 663 are threatened. 280 species are listed as vulnerable, 277 as endangered and 106 as critically endangered. 6 species (Faurea lucida, Grevillea divaricata, Panopsis hernandezii, Roupala tobagensis, Sorocephalus crassifolius and Sorocephalus palustris) are possibly extinct and 5 species Leucadendron grandiflorum, Leucadendron spirale, Persoonia laxa, Persoonia prostrata and Stenocarpus dumbeensis) are extinct.

The major threats to Proteaceae species include habitat destruction associated with farming, mining activities, urban development and road construction and maintenance, competition with invasive species and threats associated with climate change such as droughts, floods and inappropriate fire regimes. Bushfires may be either too frequent, destroying plants before they can develop a sufficient soil-stored seed bank or too infrequent, disallowing regeneration of fire-dependent species such as some Banksia and Leucadendron species.

== Fossils ==
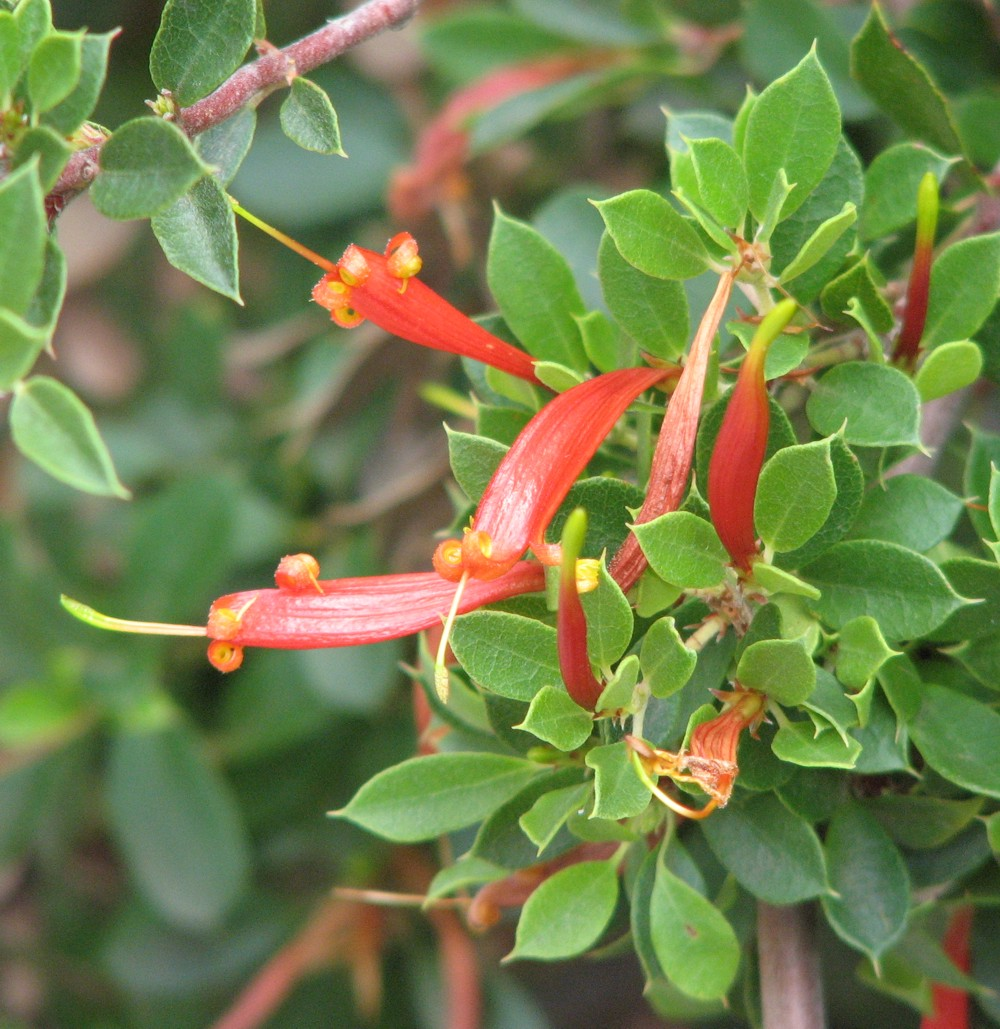
Lambertia multiflora

The Proteaceae have a rich fossil record, despite the inherent difficulties in identifying remains that do not show diagnostic characteristics. Identification usually comes from using a combination of brachy-paracytic stomata and the unusual trichome bases or, in other cases, the unusual structure of pollen tetrads. Xylocaryon was identified as a member of the Proteaceae from the similarity of its fruit to the extant genus Eidothea. Fossils attributable to this family have been found on the majority of areas that formed the Gondwana supercontinent. A wide variety of pollen belonging to this family dating back to the Upper Cretaceous (Campanian-Maastrichtian) from the south east of Australia and pollen from the Middle Cretaceous (Cenomanian-Turonian) from northern Africa and Peru described as Triorites africaensis. The first macrofossils appear twenty million years later in the Palaeocene of South America and the north east of Australia. The fossil record of some areas, such as New Zealand and Tasmania, show a greater biodiversity for Proteaceae than currently exists, which supports the fact that the distribution of many taxa has changed drastically with the passage of time and that the family has suffered a general decline, including high levels of extinction during the Cenozoic.
