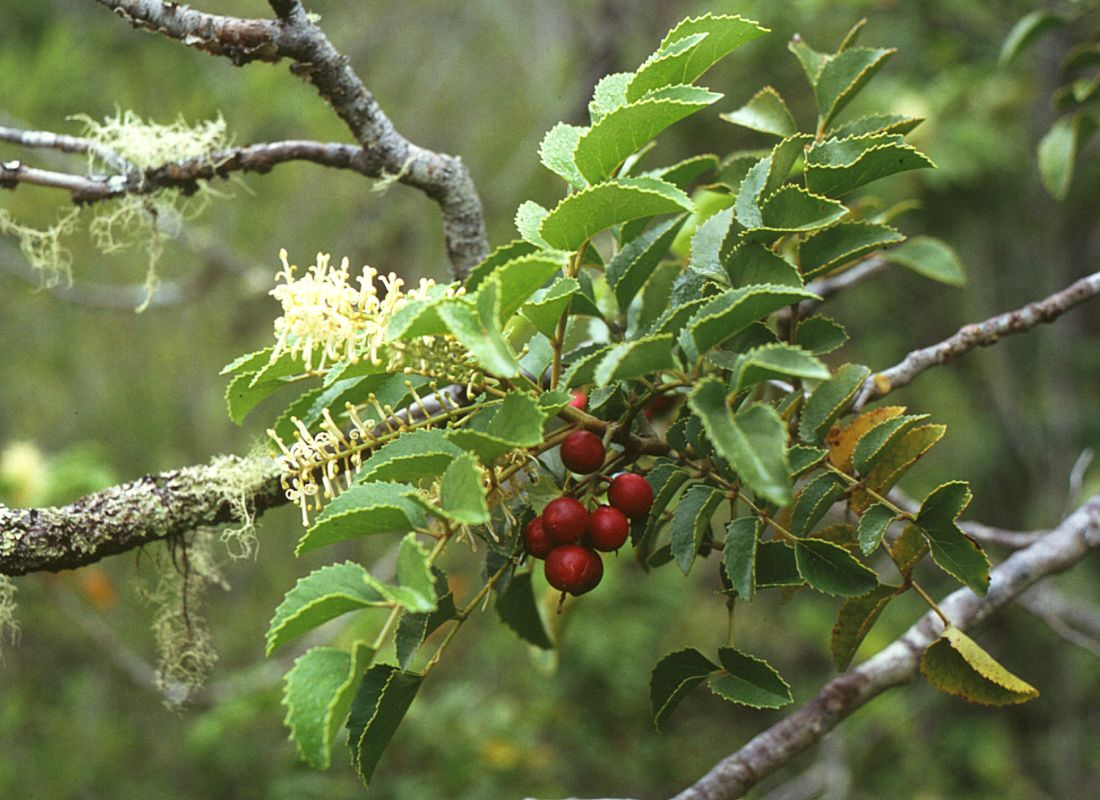
- Chilean hazel with flowers and fruits

Scientific classification
- Kingdom: Plantae
- Clade: Embryophytes
- Clade: Tracheophytes
- Clade: Angiosperms
- Clade: Eudicots
- Order: Proteales
- Family: Proteaceae
- Subfamily: Grevilleoideae
- Tribe: Macadamieae
- Subtribe: Gevuininae
- Genus: Gevuina; Molina
- Species: G. avellana

Binomial name
- Gevuina avellana (Molina) Gaertn.

= Gevuina =

Species of plant

Gevuina avellana, commonly known as the Chilean hazelnut (avellano chileno in Spanish) or Gevuina hazelnut, is an evergreen tree growing up to 20 meters (65 feet) tall. It is the only species currently classified in the genus Gevuina belonging to the family Proteaceae. It is native to southern Chile and adjacent valleys in Argentina; it is found from sea level to 700 meters (2,300 feet) above sea level with a distribution that extends from 35° to 44° south latitude. (Note: In the north Gevuina avellana grows along the coast beyond Itata River as part of the Maulino forest. To the south the plant grows as far as Guaitecas Archipelago.) Its indigenous name is guevin in Mapudungun.

The concentration of guevin trees in forest is highly irregular and difficult to predict. It may grow on flatland or hilly terrain, in clay or stony soils.

== Description ==
Guevin trees usually grow close to other broad-leaved trees such as Nothofagus obliqua, Nothofagus dombeyi, N. alpina, N. glauca or Laureliopsis. Yet, it does also grow in associations dominated by the conifers Austrocedrus, Fitzroya and Pilgerodendron. As such, guevin trees do not form pure stands.

The composite leaves are bright green and toothed, and the tree is in flower between July and November. The flowers are very small and beige to whitish, are bisexual and group two by two in long racemes.

The fruit is a dark red nut when young and turns black. The peel is woody. It can grow up straight or branched from the soil, making up either a tree or a shrub.

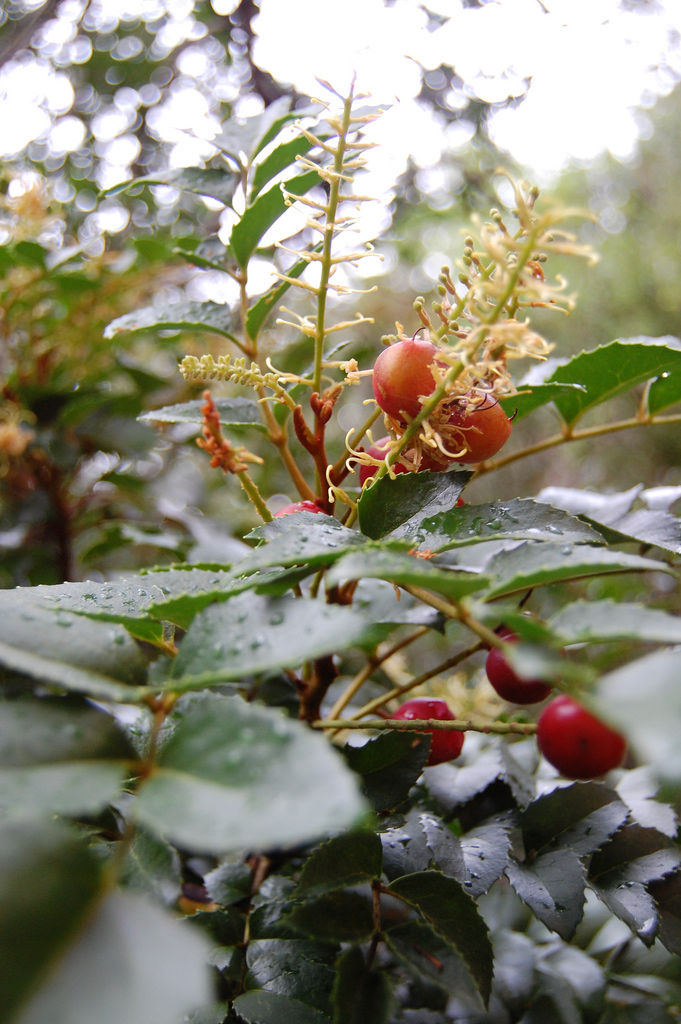
Flowers and fruits

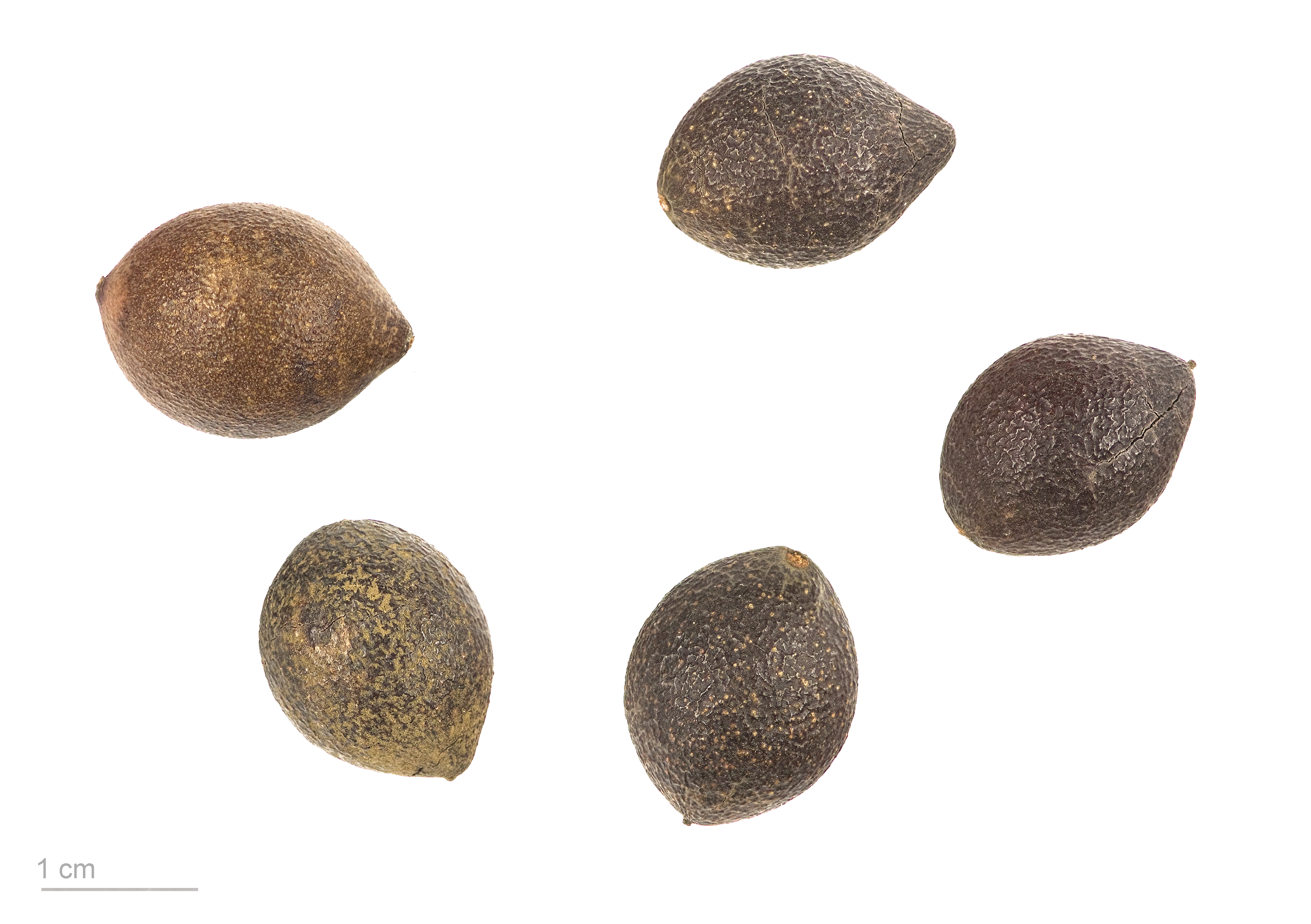
Guevin seeds from the MHNT.

== Taxonomy ==
The name Gevuina comes from its native name guevin. The epithet avellana comes from Spanish meaning "hazelnut" because Spanish settlers found guevin nuts similar to those nuts they knew from Europe. Yet the species are not closely related.

In some classifications, Gevuinia is recognised with three species: one endemic to Australia (Gevuina bleasdalei), another to New Guinea (Gevuina papuana), and one species in Chile (Gevuina avellana). Other taxonomic reports place the Australian and New Guinea species in the genus Bleasdalea or in the Fijian endemic genus Turrillia, and leave Gevuina with only Gevuina avellana. The Flora of Australia retains these 2 species in Gevuinia, but the most recent classification places the Australian and New Guinea species as Bleasdalea bleasdalei and B. papuana Other studies suggest that Gevuina may be most closely related to the Australian Cardwellia. The common ancestor of both likely dispersed across the Antarctic land bridge during the Eocene.

== Uses and cultivation ==
Guevin seeds are eaten raw, cooked in boiling water or toasted. The nuts contain about 12 percent protein, 49 percent oil, and 24 percent carbohydrates. The seed has a very high concentration of monounsaturated oils and is also obtained for several purposes in Chile. It is rich in antioxidants such as vitamin E (α-tocotrienol) and β-carotene. Its oil is an ingredient in some sunscreens. Gevuina oil is used as a cosmetic ingredient for its moisturizing qualities and because it is a source of omega 7 fatty acids (palmitoleic acid). Production of seeds may vary greatly from tree to tree. The plant is also a source of cetoleic acid, a rare fatty acid.

The tree is a good honey plant for bees and is also cultivated as an ornamental plant. The seed shells contain tannin that is used for tanning leather. The tree has an acceptable frost resistance (at least −12 °C (10 °F)) when mature. The wood is cream-colored with dark brown streaking and is used in cabinetry and musical instruments. It was introduced to Great Britain in 1826. It grows well there, in Ireland and in New Zealand and California. A few specimens are cultivated in Spain and in the Pacific Northwest of the United States. It grows well in temperate oceanic climates with cool temperatures where frosts occur commonly in winter, and has thrived in southern New Zealand. It needs 5 years to first harvest and 7 or 8 years for full production. In Seattle, Washington, squirrels and birds eat seeds from the trees. New varieties of greater yield than the original wild stock are being developed in both Chile and New Zealand.

As of 1982, only a tiny fraction of the nuts of wild stands were collected for processing.

== Gallery ==
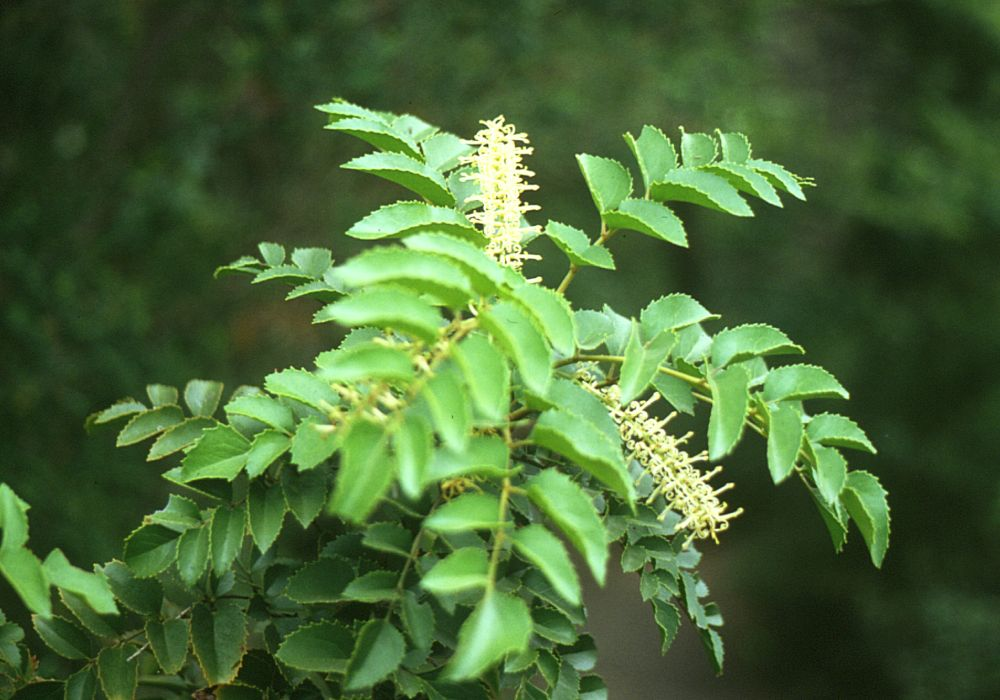
Leaves and flowers

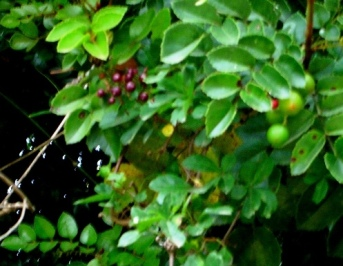
Twig

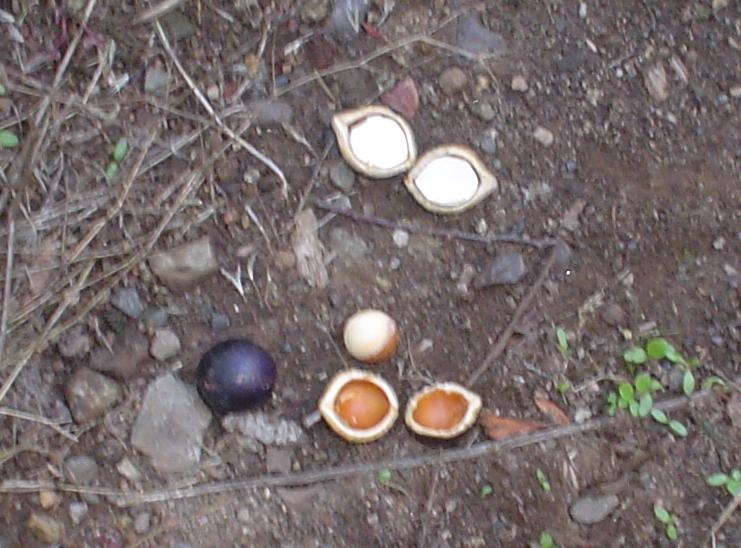
Fallen nuts

== See also ==
- Avellanita bustillosii

== Sources ==
- Rodríguez, Roberto; Mathei, Oscar y Quezada, Max. 1983. Flora arbórea de Chile. Universidad de Concepción. 408p.
- Donoso, C. 2005. Árboles nativos de Chile. Guía de reconocimiento. Edición 4. Marisa Cuneo Ediciones, Valdivia, Chile. 136p.
- Hoffmann, A. 1982. Flora silvestre de Chile zona araucana. Edición 4. Ediciones Fundación Claudio Gay, Santiago, Chile. 258p.
- Muñoz, M. 1980. Flora del Parque Nacional Puyehue. Editorial Universitaria, Santiago, Chile. 557p.
- "Gevuina avellana". Enciclopedia de la Flora Chilena.
- "Gevuina avellana in Scotland". PlantenTuin Esveld.
- "Gevuina avellana: Potential for commercial nuts". Acta Horticulturae.
- "A cool climate nut of the Proteaceae plant tropical family" (PDF). New Zealand Crop & Food Research. Archived from the original (PDF) on 2008-10-14.
