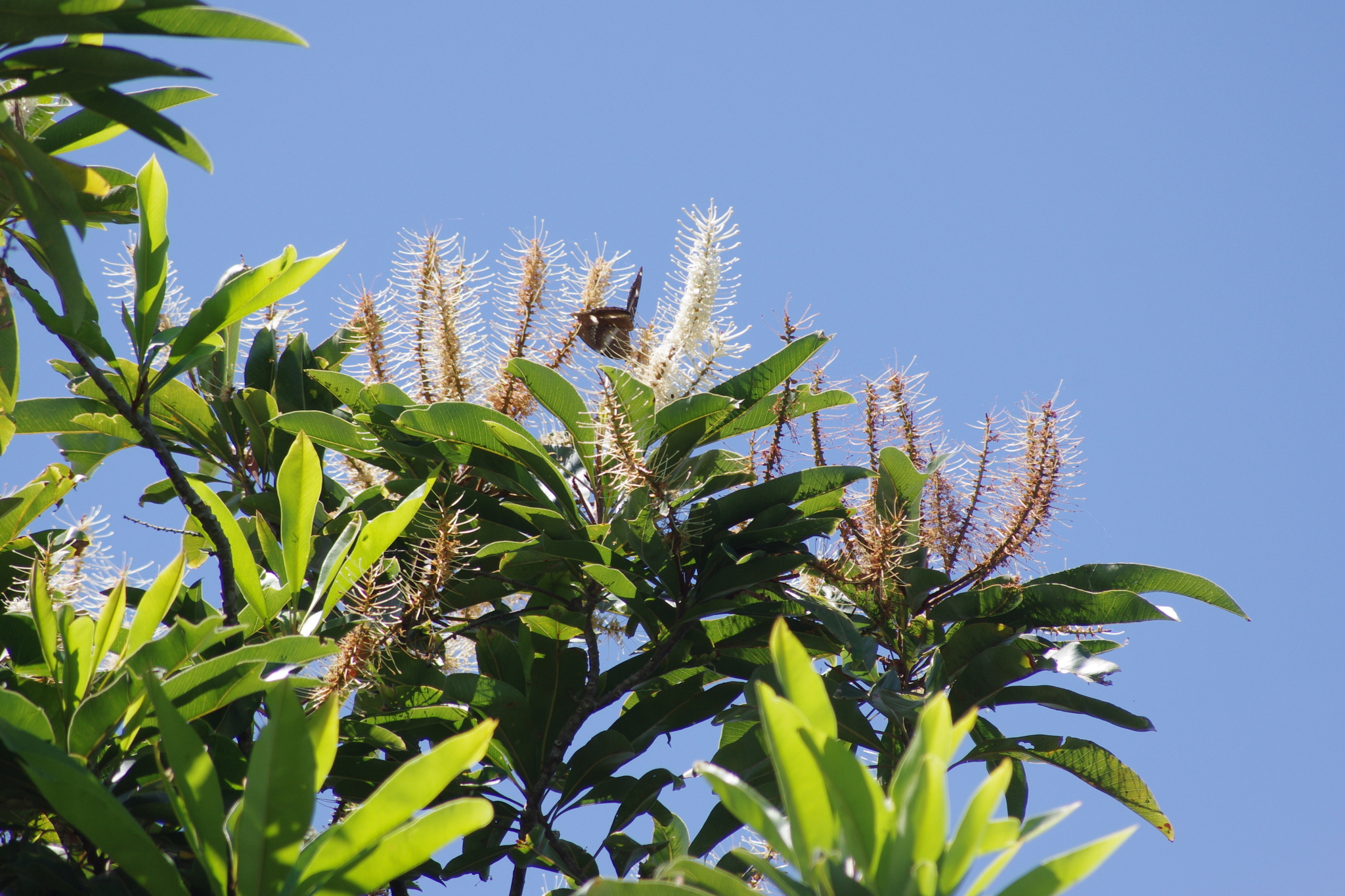
- In flower

Conservation status
- Least Concern (NCA)
- Least Concern (IUCN 3.1)

Scientific classification
- Kingdom: Plantae
- Clade: Tracheophytes
- Clade: Angiosperms
- Clade: Eudicots
- Order: Proteales
- Family: Proteaceae
- Subfamily: Grevilleoideae
- Tribe: Macadamieae
- Subtribe: Gevuininae
- Genus: Cardwellia; F.Muell.
- Species: C. sublimis

Binomial name
- Cardwellia sublimis F.Muell.

= Cardwellia =

Northern silky oak

Monotypic genus of plants

Cardwellia is a monotypic genus (i.e. a genus that contains only one species) in the protea and macadamia family Proteaceae. The sole described species is Cardwellia sublimis − commonly known as northern silky oak or bull oak − which is endemic to the rainforests of northeastern Queensland, Australia. It was first described in 1865 and has been classified as a least concern species. Its timber has been used for house construction and furniture.

== Description ==
Cardwellia sublimis is a large tree reaching up to 40 m (130 ft) in height and a diameter of 2 m (6 ft 7 in), often becoming an emergent standing well above the canopy. The bark is thin and there is usually no buttressing. The leaves are alternate, dark green above with a silvery brown sheen below. On seedlings the leaves are simple but on mature trees they are pinnately compound, and there is a graduation of the leaf morphology as the tree grows (see gallery). Leaves on mature trees reach up to 65 cm (26 in) long with a petiole up to 11 cm (4.3 in) long. They have 3 to 10 pairs of oval to oblong leaflets, each of which is 9–18 cm (3.5–7.1 in) long and 4–7 cm (1.6–2.8 in) wide.

The inflorescence is a raceme up to 16 cm (6.3 in) long, with sessile flowers in pairs carried on a short peduncle. They are produced above the tree canopy, and prolific − the canopy can be covered with the cream-white flowerheads in late spring and summer.

The fruit are large, ellipsoidal, woody, dehiscent follicles about 8–11 cm (3.1–4.3 in) long and 5–6 cm (2.0–2.4 in) wide, carried on vertical peduncles and displayed above the canopy, creating a distinctive feature of this species. They split along one side to release the seeds, and will persist for some time both on the tree and on the ground after they have fallen. They contain up to 14 winged seeds measuring about 7 by 3 cm (2.8 by 1.2 in).

== Taxonomy and naming ==
The genus, and its sole included species, were first described by Victorian colonial botanist Ferdinand von Mueller in 1865, based on material collected by John Dallachy from Rockingham Bay in north Queensland. Mueller published the description in volume 5 of his book Fragmenta phytographiæ Australiæ.

=== Phylogeny ===
Molecular analysis indicates that this genus is a member of the subtribe Gevuininae, along with Sleumerodendron, Euplassa, Gevuina, Bleasdalea, Hicksbeachia, Kermadecia and Turrillia, and is thought to be the earliest offshoot from the main ancestor of all these genera, having separated around 35 million years ago in the late Eocene. The common ancestor of the South American genus Gevuina is thought to have dispersed across the Antarctic land bridge during the Eocene.

=== Etymology ===
Mueller created the genus name in honour of Edward Cardwell, who was Secretary of State for the Colonies from 1864 to 1866. The species name that he chose is the Latin adjective sublimis, with the meanings uplifted, high, lofty, exalted, or sublime − it may possibly be a reference to the fruit (which is held above the tree's canopy) or to the height of the tree itself.

=== Common names ===
The name for this tree in the Dyirbal language is jungan. The more general word gurruŋun is used in their taboo vocabulary, and is also applied to Darlingia ferruginea and Helicia australasica. In the English language, the common names "bull oak" and "northern silky oak" arose in colonial times and are references to the similarity of the grain of its timber to that of the oaks of England and Europe that were more familiar to the colonists.

== Distribution and habitat ==
Cardwellia sublimis is endemic to a small part of northeastern Queensland, occurring from the area around Rossville south to the Paluma Range National Park, and from the coastal flats to the adjacent ranges and tablelands. It grows in rainforest on a variety of soil types, and at altitudes from sea level to around 1,300 m (4,300 ft).

== Ecology ==
Ants (Formicidae) are known to create wounds on the trunk of the northern silky oak by biting it, in order to access and consume the sugary sap. The seeds are eaten by sulphur-crested cockatoos (Cacatua galerita) and native rats.

== Conservation ==
The northern silky oak has been assessed as least concern by both the Queensland Department of Environment and Science and the International Union for Conservation of Nature (IUCN). The IUCN states in its assessment summary that the "species was heavy logged in the past but this has stopped. Currently, the species has no immediate threats".

== Uses and cultivation ==
Cardwellia sublimis was harvested extensively in the past for its highly-regarded timber, which was widely used in houses of the traditional "Queenslander" style, especially for windows. It was also commonly used for furniture, joinery and flooring. In limited supply today, it is now used mostly for cabinet work and veneers.

Attempts to grow Cardwellia sublimis in plantations have not been very successful, however it has good potential as a park and street tree due to its large size, attractive foliage and showy flowering displays. It is readily propagated from seed (although seed must be fresh, stored for less than 6 weeks) and has been grown successfully in Melbourne.

== Gallery ==
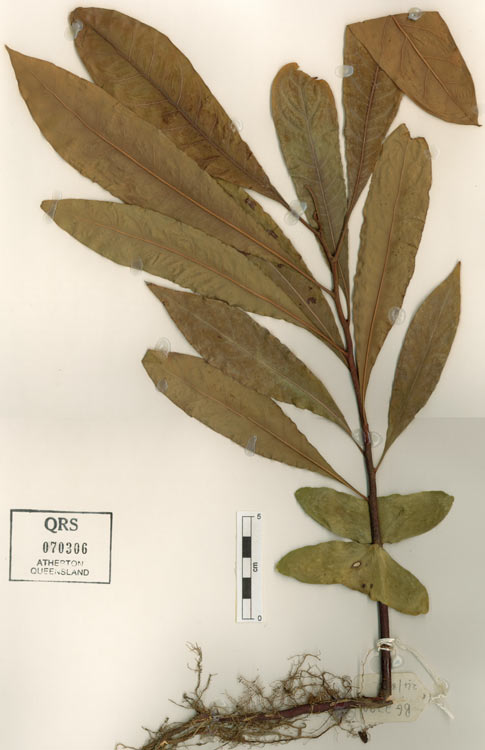
Seedling, with simple leaves and cotyledons still attached

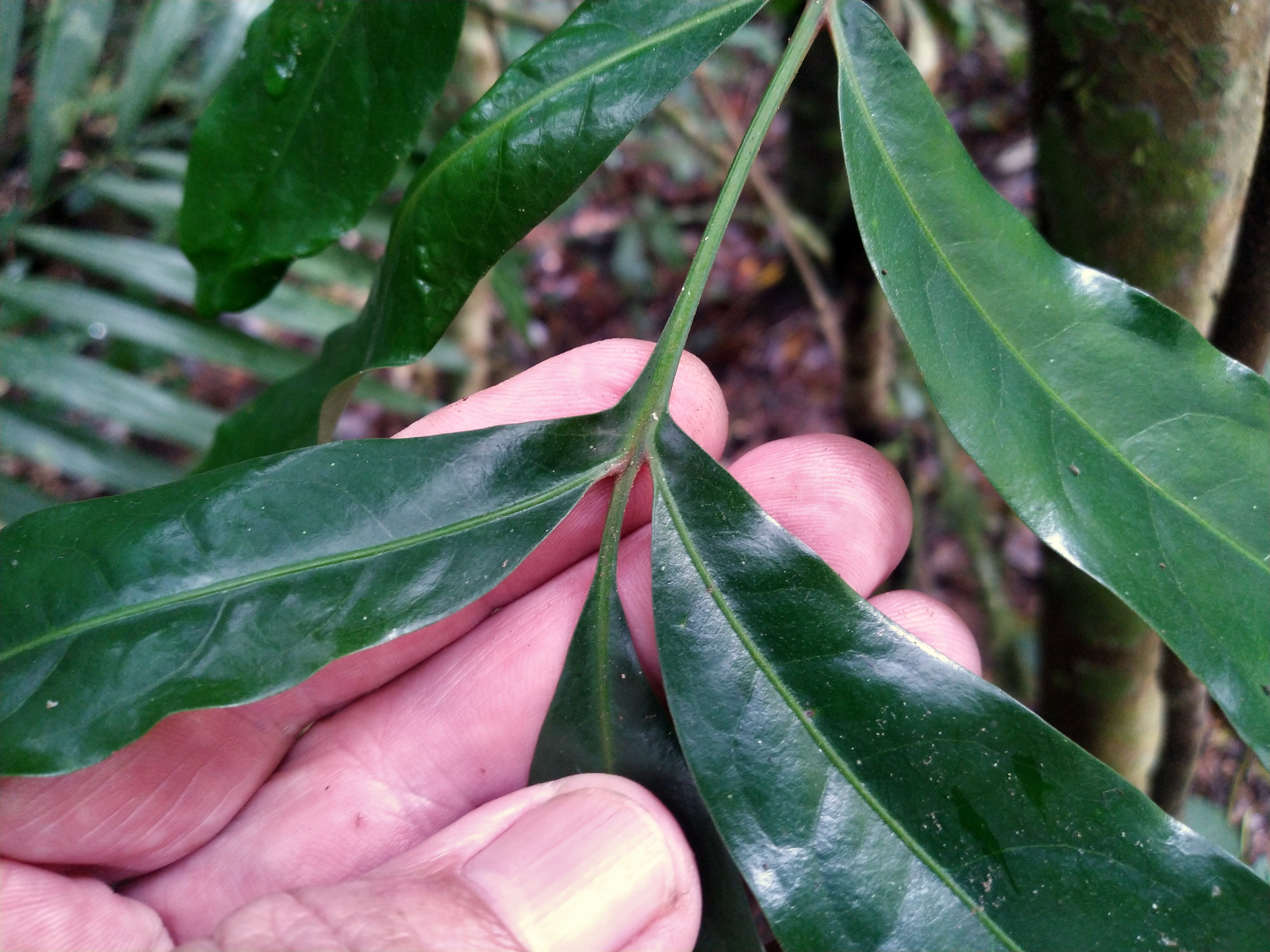
Sapling leaf, showing the intermediate pinnatisect morphology

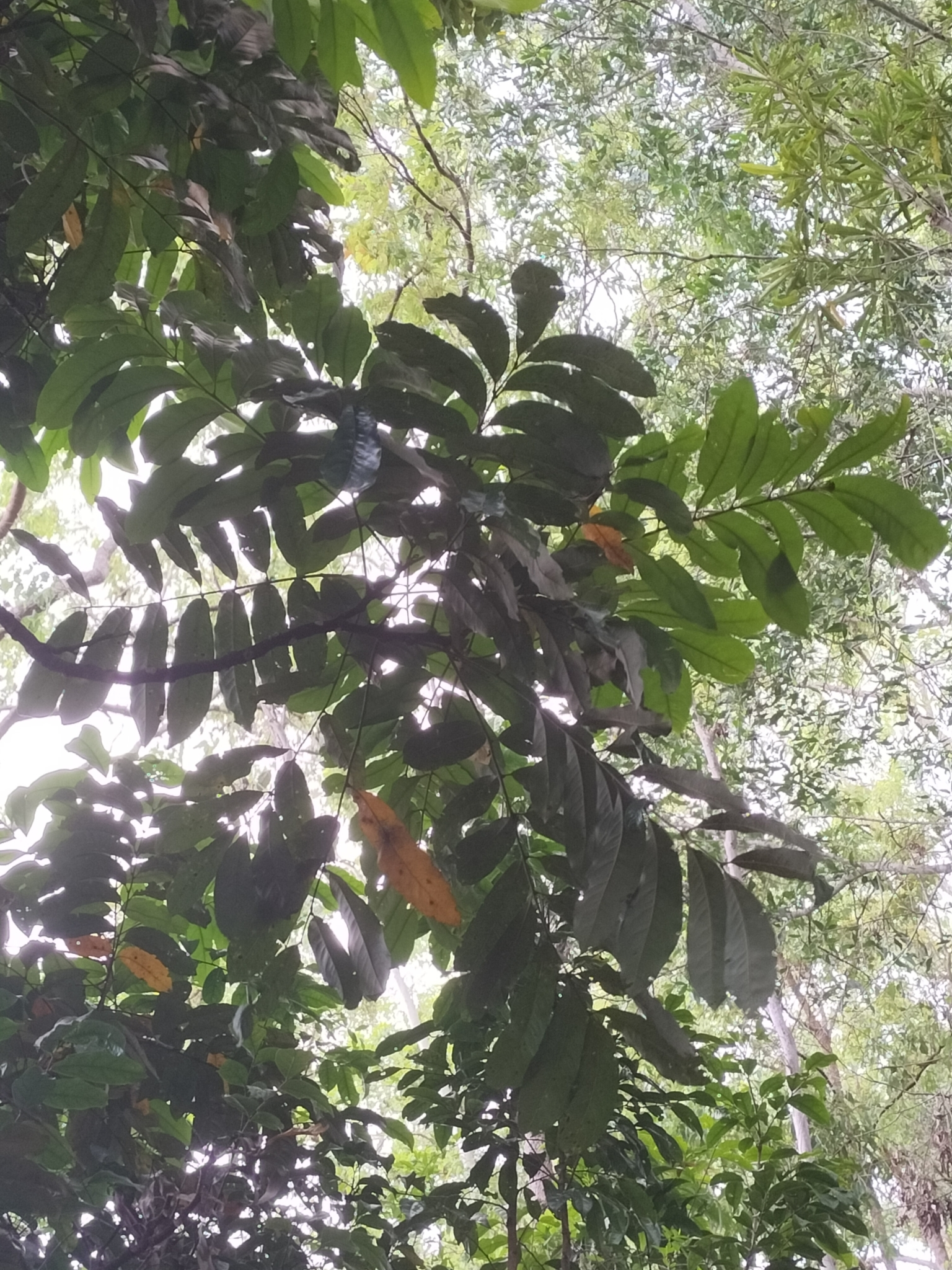
Mature pinnate leaves

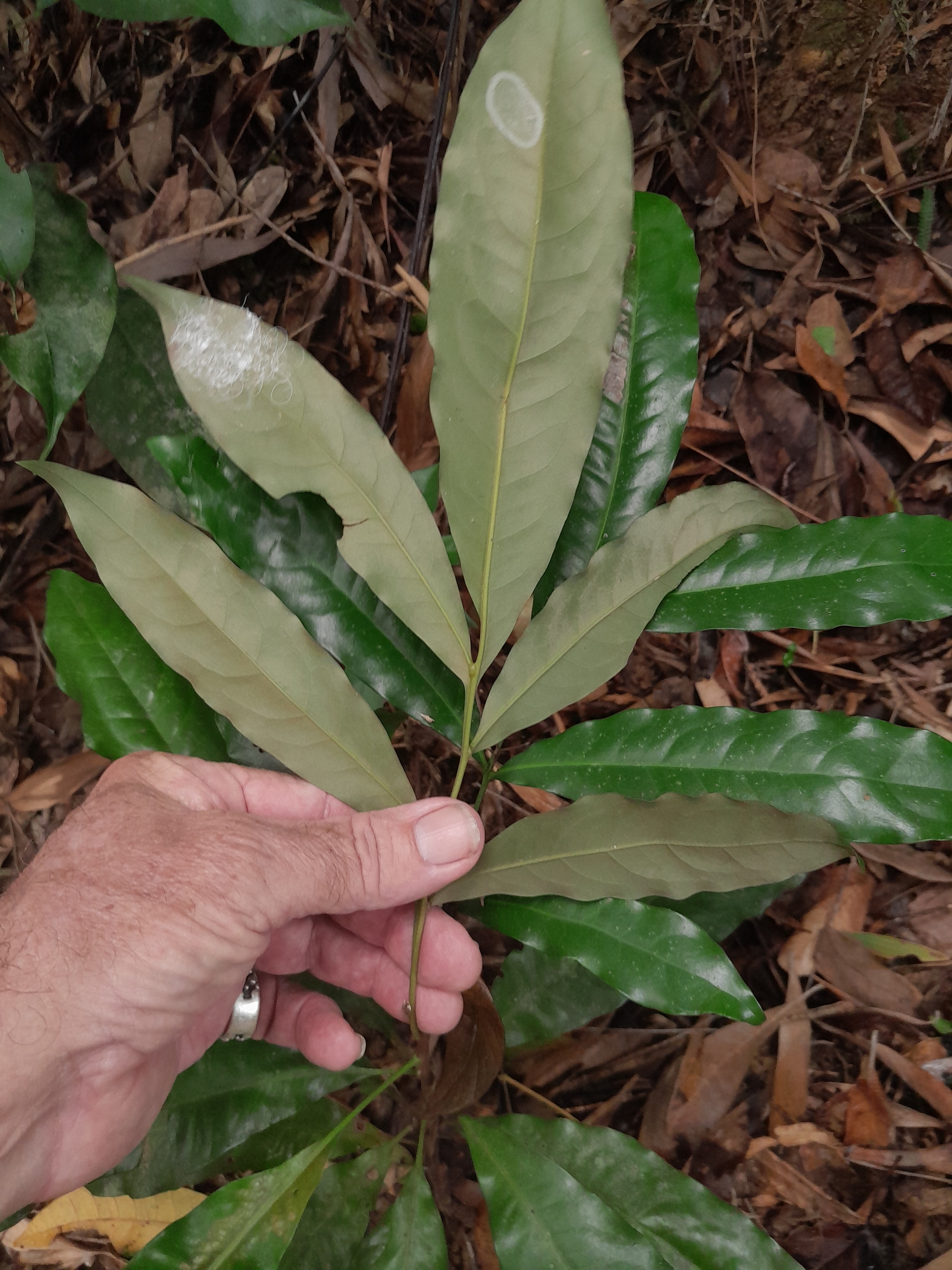
Underside of leaves

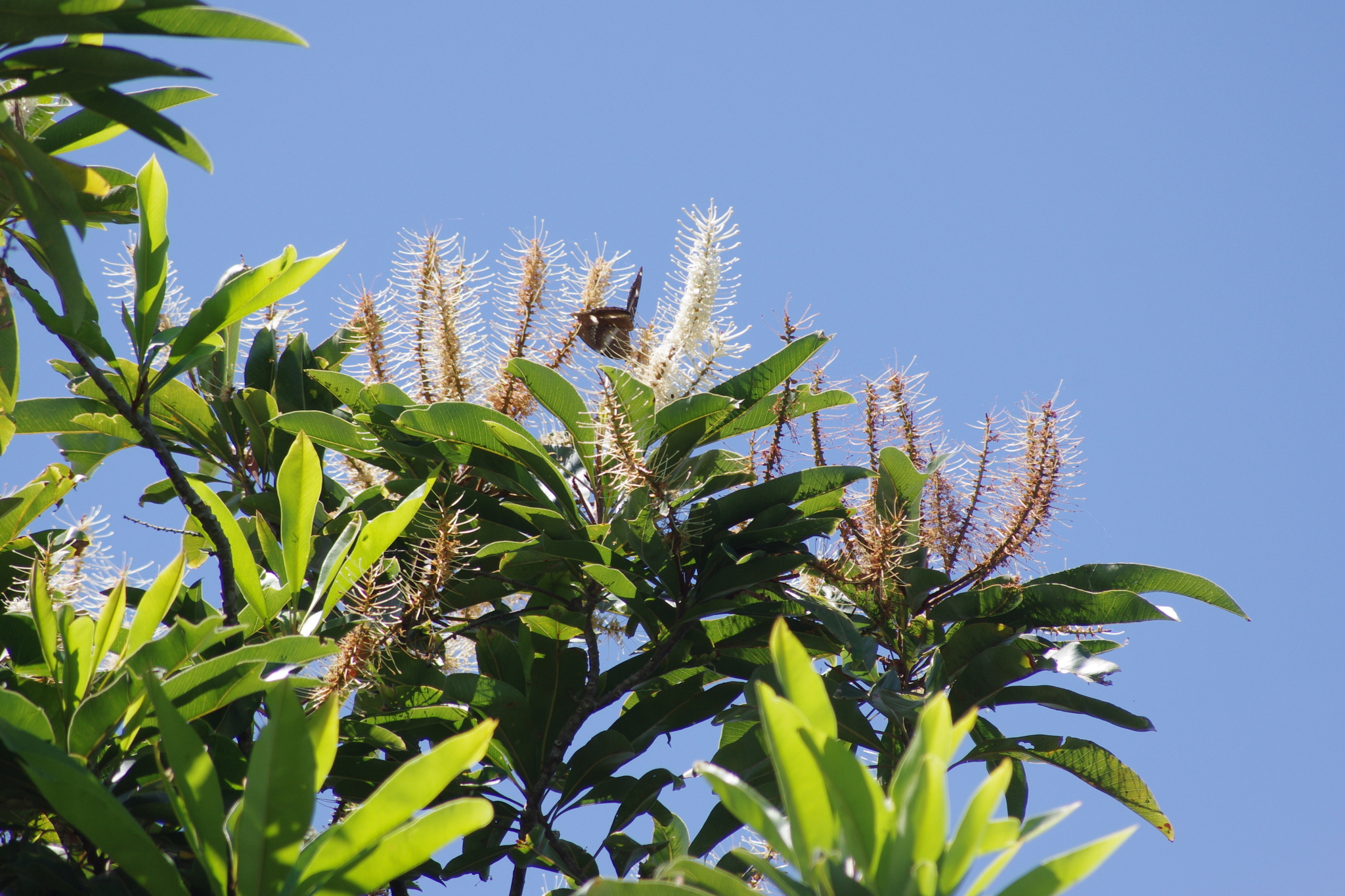
Inflorescences

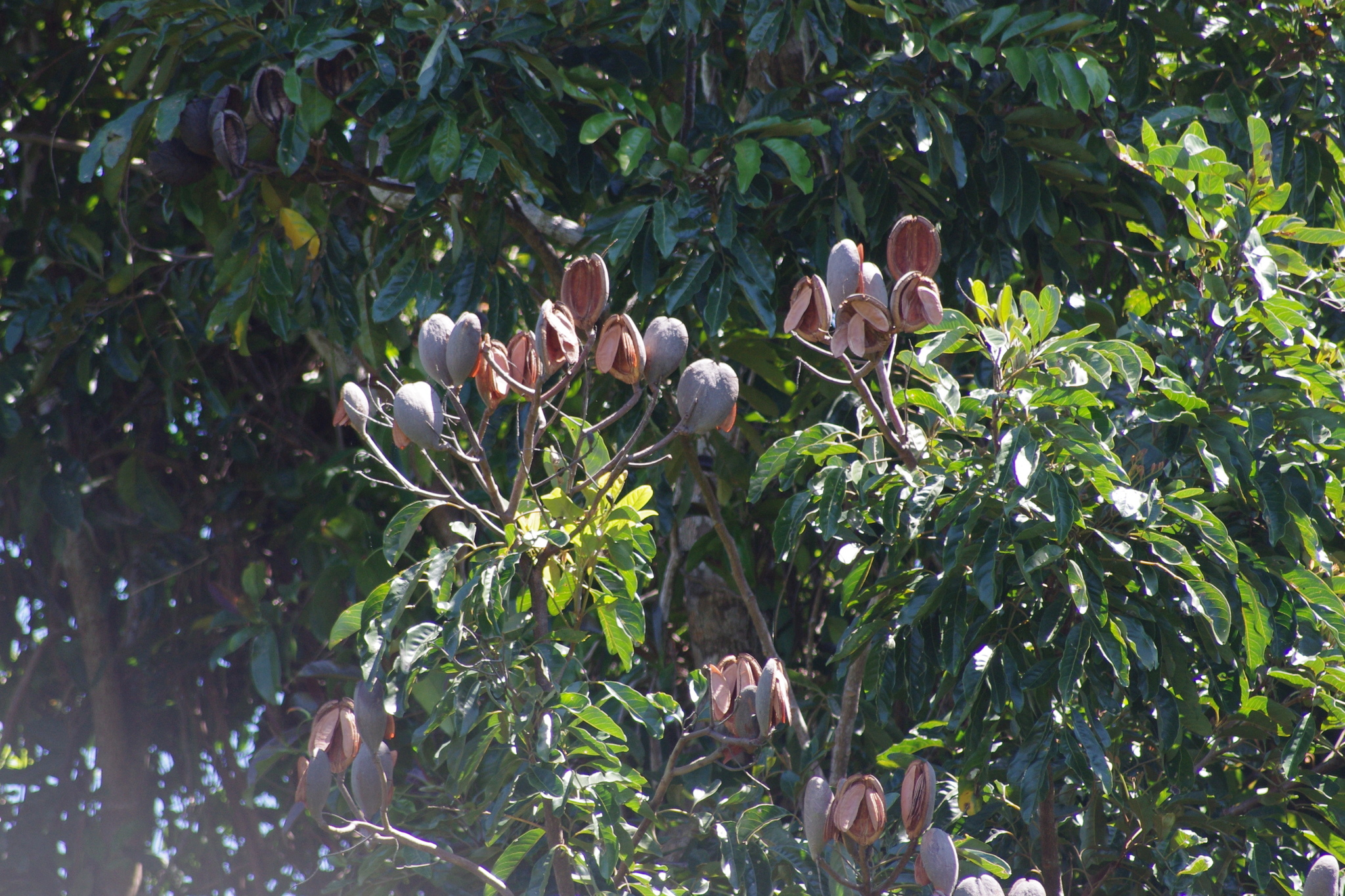
Mature fruit, some with seeds still enclosed
