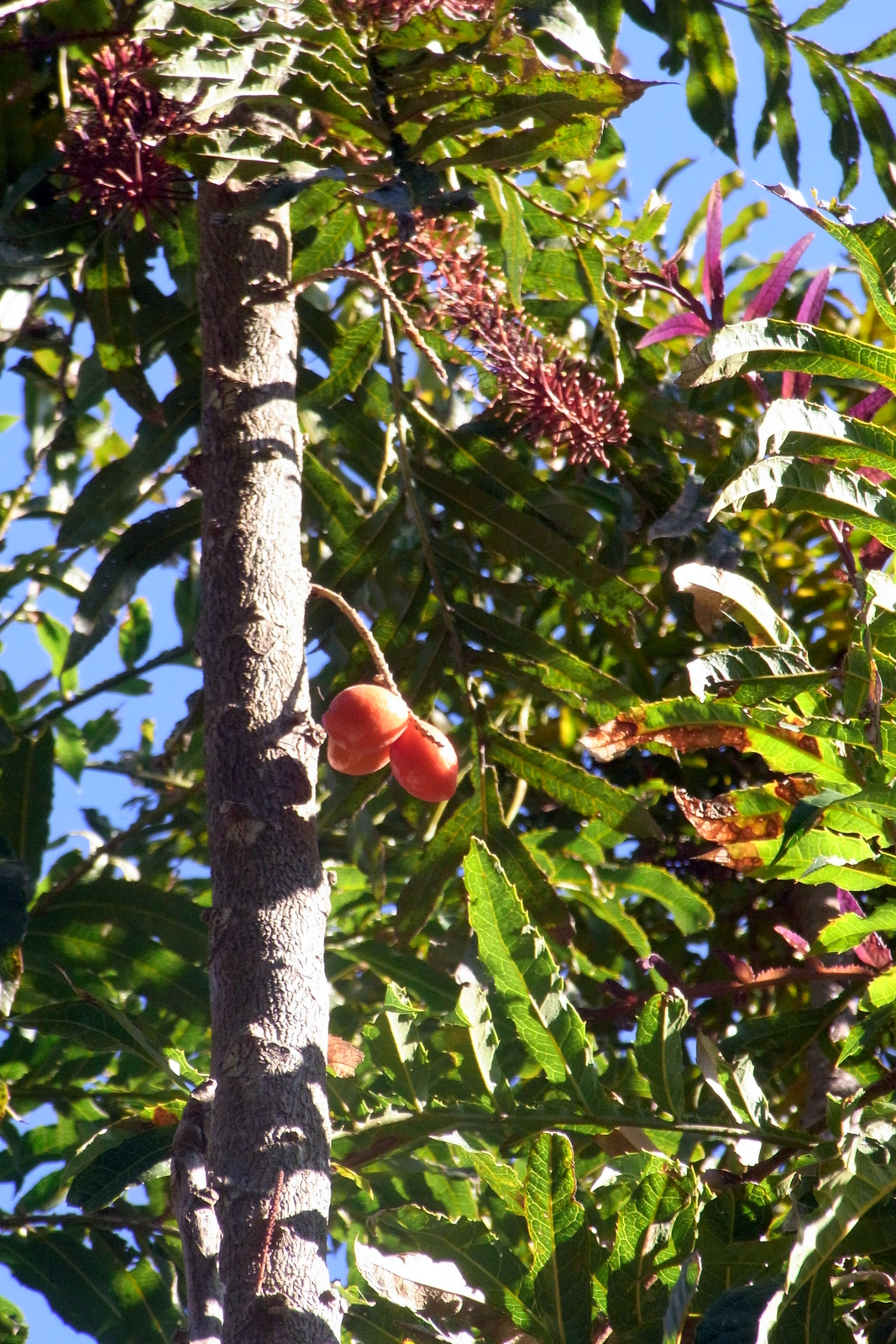
- Hicksbeachia pinnatifolia

Scientific classification
- Kingdom: Plantae
- Clade: Tracheophytes
- Clade: Angiosperms
- Clade: Eudicots
- Order: Proteales
- Family: Proteaceae
- Subfamily: Grevilleoideae
- Tribe: Macadamieae
- Subtribe: Gevuininae
- Genus: Hicksbeachia; F.Muell.

Species
- See text

= Hicksbeachia =

Genus of flowering plants

Hicksbeachia is a genus of two species of trees in the family Proteaceae. They are native to rainforests of northern New South Wales and southeastern Queensland, Australia. They are commonly known as red bopple nut or beef nut due to the bright red colour of their fruits.

== Taxonomy ==
Ferdinand von Mueller named the genus in 1883 in honour of Michael Hicks Beach who had been Secretary of State for the Colonies. Mueller named several genera, including Buckinghamia, Cardwellia, Carnarvonia and Hollandaea, after Colonial Secretaries of the time. He described the type species Hicksbeachia pinnatifolia at the time. The genus was considered monotypic until Peter Weston split the north Queensland population as a separate species H. pilosa in 1988.

Molecular and morphological analysis shows this genus is most closely related to the genus Bleasdalea, ancestors of the two genera having diverged around 15 million years ago in the Miocene. Furthermore, the common ancestor of these genera is thought to have arisen in South America around 35 million years ago in the Oligocene, leaving other branches diversifying into Gevuina and Euplassa.

Pollen which bears a strong resemblance to the living Gevuina and Hicksbeachia has been recovered from mid Cretaceous through to Eocene deposits from the northern Antarctic Peninsula, and from late Cretaceous deposits in the Otway Basin in Western Victoria. Leaf cuticles comparable to Hicksbeachia have been recovered from the Miocene Manuherikia Group of Central Otago in New Zealand's South Island.

=== Species ===
- Hicksbeachia pilosa P.H.Weston
- Hicksbeachia pinnatifolia F.Muell.

Neither of the two species is common. H. pinnatifolia is the one more commonly grown, due to its edible nuts.

== Description ==
Both species are small single-trunked trees reaching a maximum height of 15 m (50 ft). Their leaves are pinnate in shape and arranged alternately along the branches. The flowers are arranged in drooping inflorescences, and emit strong odours around nightfall, which have been likened to honey, sour milk, cat's urine, or mice.

== Distribution and habitat ==
Both species are found in rainforest in eastern Australia. H. pinnatifolia is found in northeastern New South Wales and southeastern Queensland, and H. pilosa is found in the Wet Tropics rainforests of northeastern Queensland.
