= Bull oak =

Bull oak is a common name for a number of species of Australian trees. Some of the species involved are:

- Most commonly members of the Casuarinaceae or she-oaks, including:
  - Allocasuarina luehmannii, bull oak or buloke
  - Casuarina cristata, belah
- Cardwellia, northern silky oak
