= Sleumerodendron =

Conservation status
- Least Concern (IUCN 3.1)

Scientific classification
- Kingdom: Plantae
- Clade: Tracheophytes
- Clade: Angiosperms
- Clade: Eudicots
- Order: Proteales
- Family: Proteaceae
- Subfamily: Grevilleoideae
- Tribe: Macadamieae
- Subtribe: Gevuininae
- Genus: Sleumerodendron; R Virot in A. Aubreville
- Species: S. austrocaledonicum

Binomial name
- Sleumerodendron austrocaledonicum (Brongn. & Gris) Virot, 1968

Synonyms
- Adenostephanus austrocaledonicus Brongn. & Gris

Genus of plants endemic to New Caledonia

Sleumerodendron is a monotypic genus of plant in the family Proteaceae. The sole species is Sleumerodendron austrocaledonicum.

This species is endemic to New Caledonia. It is closely related to Turrillia (Vanuatu, Fiji) and Kermadecia (New Caledonia), where it has once been placed.
