= Kermadecia pronyensis =

Conservation status
- Near Threatened (IUCN 3.1)

Scientific classification
- Kingdom: Plantae
- Clade: Embryophytes
- Clade: Tracheophytes
- Clade: Angiosperms
- Clade: Eudicots
- Order: Proteales
- Family: Proteaceae
- Genus: Kermadecia
- Species: K. pronyensis

Binomial name
- Kermadecia pronyensis (Guillaumin) Guillaumin

Species of plant endemic to New Caledonia

Kermadecia pronyensis is a species of plant in the family Proteaceae. It is endemic to New Caledonia. It is threatened by habitat loss.
