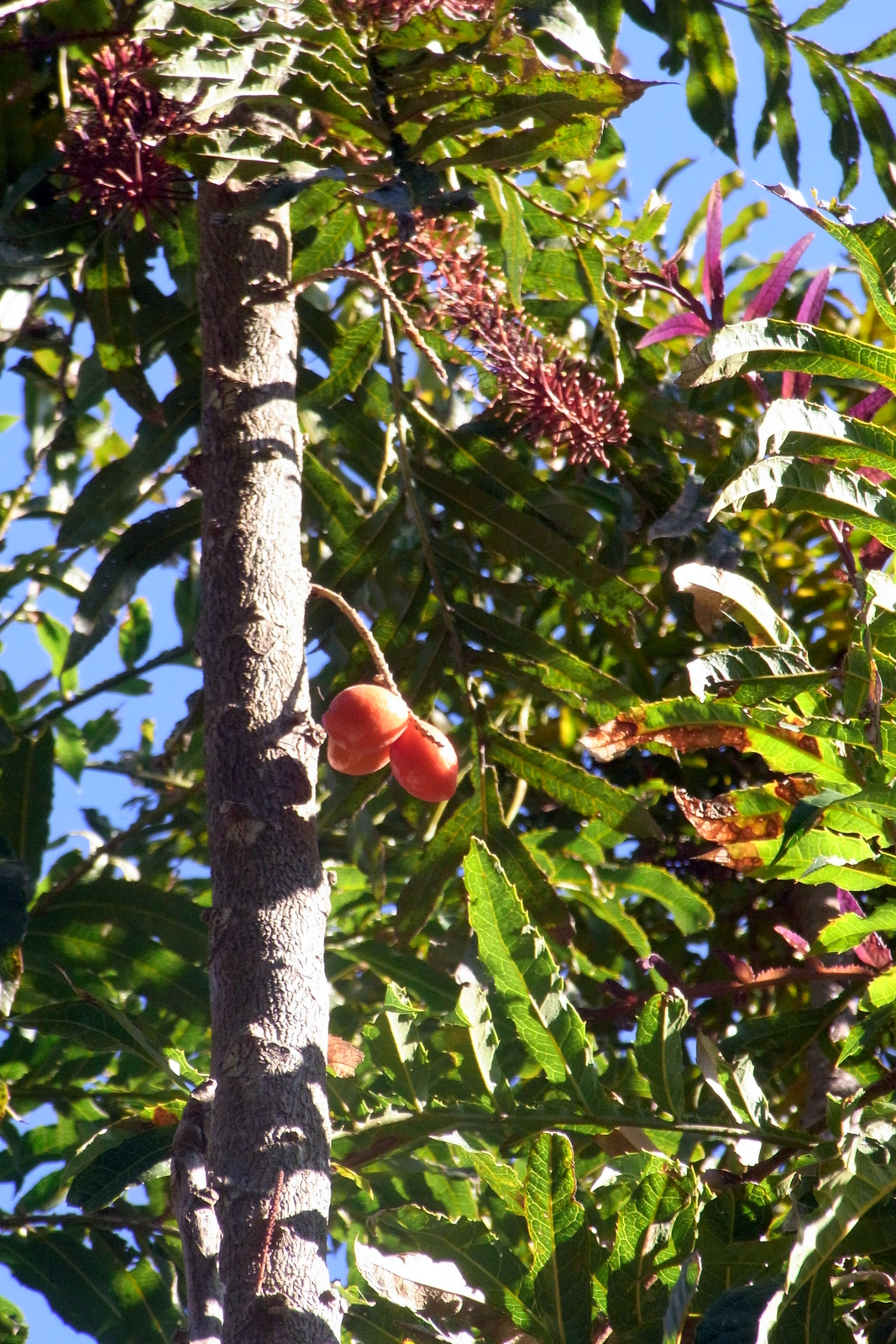
- Fruiting tree

Conservation status
- Vulnerable (EPBC Act)

Scientific classification
- Kingdom: Plantae
- Clade: Tracheophytes
- Clade: Angiosperms
- Clade: Eudicots
- Order: Proteales
- Family: Proteaceae
- Genus: Hicksbeachia
- Species: H. pinnatifolia

Binomial name
- Hicksbeachia pinnatifolia F.Muell.

= Hicksbeachia pinnatifolia =

Species of tree

Hicksbeachia pinnatifolia is a small tree in the family Proteaceae. Common names include red bopple nut, monkey nut, red nut, beef nut, rose nut and ivory silky oak.

The tree produces fleshy, red fruits during spring and summer. The rare species is native to subtropical rainforest in parts of Australia. The seeds are edible.

== Description ==
Hicksbeachia pinnatifolia is encountered as a tree to 10 m (33 ft) in height, with a maximum trunk diameter of 20 cm (8 in). It may have additional stems rising from the base and suckers after being cleared. Its large compound leaves are pinnate and measure from 40 to 100 cm (16 to 39 in) long. There may be 15 to 25 individual leaflets, which measure around 6–25 cm (2 1/2–10 in) long and 2–6 cm (3/4–2 1/4 in) wide. The leaf margins are lined with fine teeth. New growth is covered with fine rusty hair, as are the inflorescences that emerge in winter and spring (August to October). The flower spikes droop around 14 to 50 cm (5 1/2 to 19 1/2 in) in length and are shades of purple and brown and cream. They have a strong sweet smell, described as sickly by some. They are followed in spring and summer by a red fleshy oval fruit, 3–5 cm (1 1/4–2 in) long, 2–2.8 cm (3/4–1 in) wide. The black seed is within the fruit, which does not fall away.

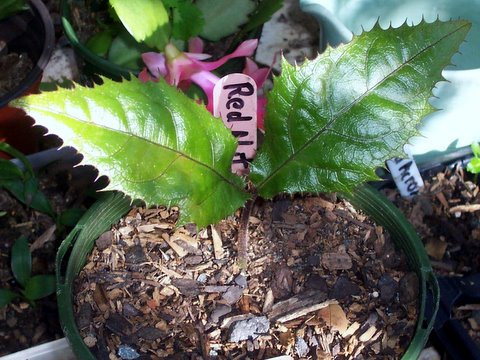
Seedling

== Taxonomy ==
Hicksbeachia pinnatifolia was first described by German-Australian botanist Ferdinand von Mueller in 1883 from a collection near the Tweed River in northern New South Wales.

== Distribution and habitat ==
Hicksbeachia pinnatifolia is found in (and on the margins of) subtropical rain forest from Tamborine Mountain in the southeastern corner of Queensland to the Nambucca Valley in on the New South Wales mid-north coast. It is a component of the understory.

== Uses ==
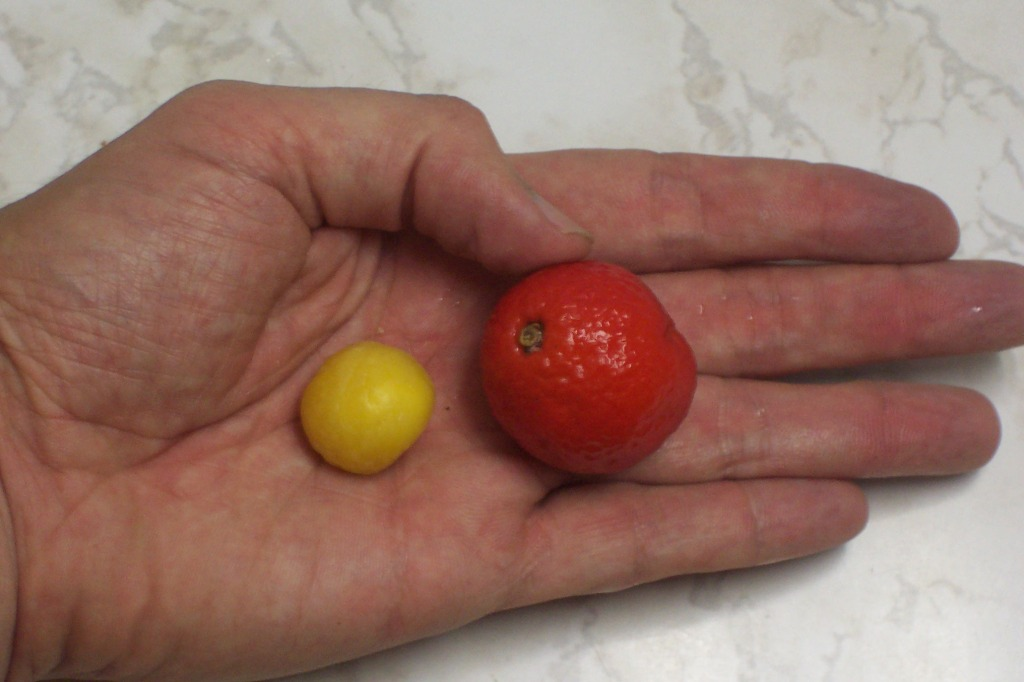
Fruit of H. pinnatifolia (right, orange) compared to that of Diploglottis campbellii (left, yellow)

The seed is edible, though not as valued as that of its relative the macadamia.

It is not commercially cultivated but is sometimes grown as an ornamental tree. It can be difficult to establish in the garden. Germination from fresh seed is reliable with a high percentage of success. However, many juveniles soon die of fungal disease. Alexander Floyd recommends adding original leaf litter from beneath the parent tree to promote beneficial anti-fungal micro-organisms.
