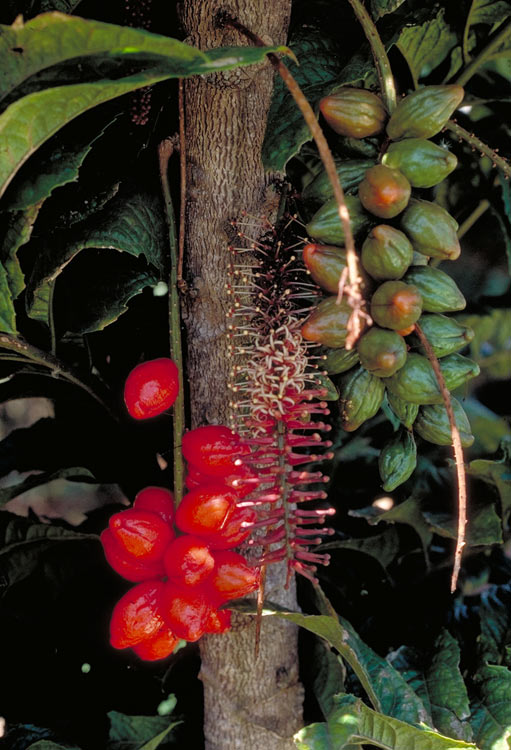
- Flowers and fruit

Conservation status
- Least Concern (NCA)

Scientific classification
- Kingdom: Plantae
- Clade: Tracheophytes
- Clade: Angiosperms
- Clade: Eudicots
- Order: Proteales
- Family: Proteaceae
- Genus: Hicksbeachia
- Species: H. pilosa

Binomial name
- Hicksbeachia pilosa P.H. Weston

= Hicksbeachia pilosa =

Red bauple nut

Species of plant endemic to Australia

Hicksbeachia pilosa is a small tree in the family Proteaceae. This rare species is endemic to the rainforests of the wet tropics region of northeastern Queensland, Australia. It was first described in 1988 by Australian botanist Peter H. Weston, after a collection by Garry Sankowsky and Peter Hind in 1986 at Bobbin Bobbin Falls in North Queensland. Its specific name is the Latin adjective pilosus "hairy".

Hicksbeachia pilosa is found in rainforest from the Big Tableland to the Cardwell Range in northeastern Queensland.
