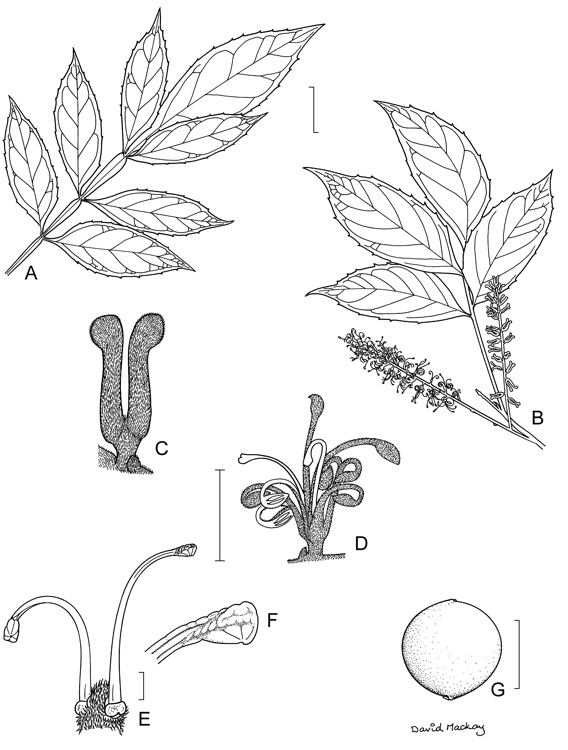

Conservation status
- Least Concern (NCA)
- Least Concern (IUCN 3.1)

Scientific classification
- Kingdom: Plantae
- Clade: Embryophytes
- Clade: Tracheophytes
- Clade: Angiosperms
- Clade: Eudicots
- Order: Proteales
- Family: Proteaceae
- Genus: Bleasdalea
- Species: B. bleasdalei

Binomial name
- Bleasdalea bleasdalei (F.Muell.) A.C.Sm. & J.E.Haas

Synonyms
- Adenostephanus bleasdalii (F.Muell.) Benth.; Bleasdalea cupanoides F.Muell. ex Domin; Euplassa bleasdalei (F.Muell.) Diels; Gevuina bleasdalei (F.Muell.) Sleumer; Grevillea bleasdalei F.Muell.; Kermadecia bleasdalei (F.Muell.) F.M.Bailey; Roupala bleasdalei (F.Muell.) F.Muell.; Turrillia bleasdalei (F.Muell.) A.C.Sm.

= Bleasdalea bleasdalei =

Blush silky oak

Species of tree native to Australia

Bleasdalea bleasdalei is a species of rainforest tree in the family Proteaceae from Far North Queensland. First described as Grevillea bleasdalei by Ferdinand von Mueller, it was placed in its current genus in 1975.

== Gallery ==
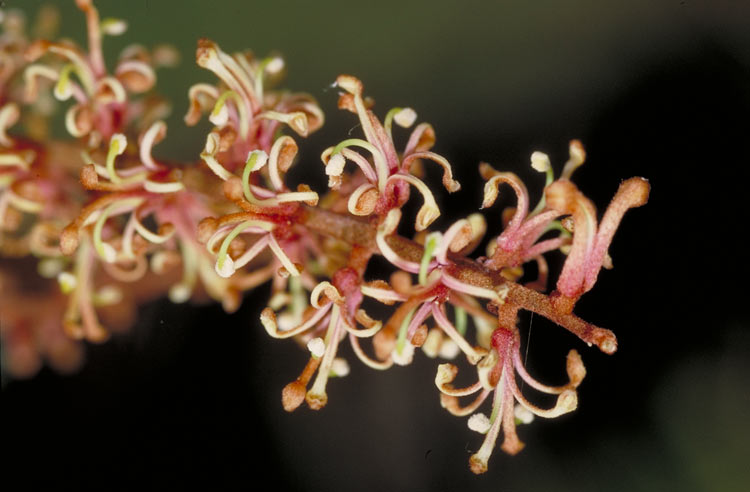
Inflorescence

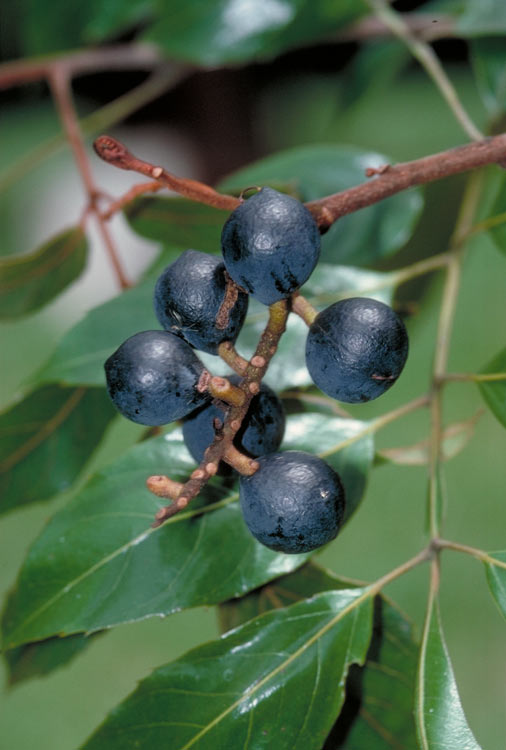
Fruit
