= Turrillia =

Scientific classification
- Kingdom: Plantae
- Clade: Tracheophytes
- Clade: Angiosperms
- Clade: Eudicots
- Order: Proteales
- Family: Proteaceae
- Subfamily: Grevilleoideae
- Tribe: Macadamieae
- Subtribe: Gevuininae
- Genus: Turrillia; A.C.Sm.

Species
- Turrillia bleasdalei (F. Muell.) A.C.Sm.; Turrillia lutea (Guillaumin) A.C.Sm.; Turrillia vitiensis (Turrill) A.C.Sm.

Genus of plants native to Oceania

Turrillia is a genus of plants in the family Proteaceae, native to Oceania.

The genus was named by American botanist Albert Charles Smith in 1985, in Flora Vitiensis Nova 3, containing five species. Only three, from Fiji and Vanuatu, are generally accepted as belonging to the genus.

It is closely related to Kermadecia (where its species were once placed) and Sleumerodendron, both endemic to New Caledonia.
