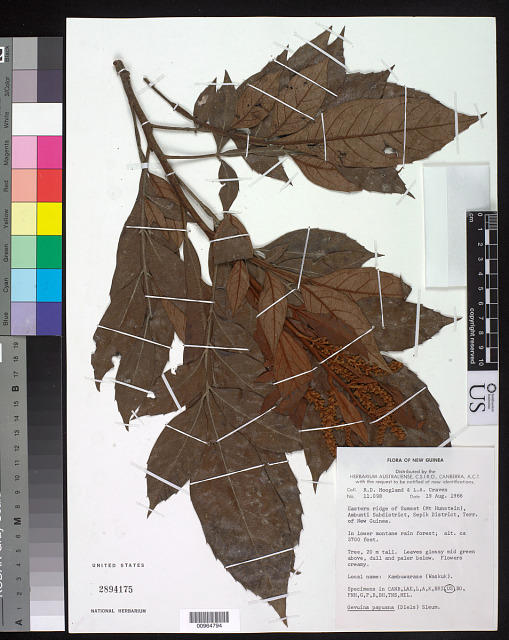

Conservation status
- Endangered (IUCN 3.1)

Scientific classification
- Kingdom: Plantae
- Clade: Tracheophytes
- Clade: Angiosperms
- Clade: Eudicots
- Order: Proteales
- Family: Proteaceae
- Genus: Bleasdalea
- Species: B. papuana

Binomial name
- Bleasdalea papuana (Diels) Domin

Synonyms
- Euplassa papuana Diels; Gevuina papuana (Diels) Sleumer; Turrillia papuana (Diels) A.C.Sm.

= Bleasdalea papuana =

Species of flowering plant

Bleasdalea papuana is a species of flowering plant in the macadamia family Proteaceae. It is endemic to New Guinea and is threatened by habitat loss.
