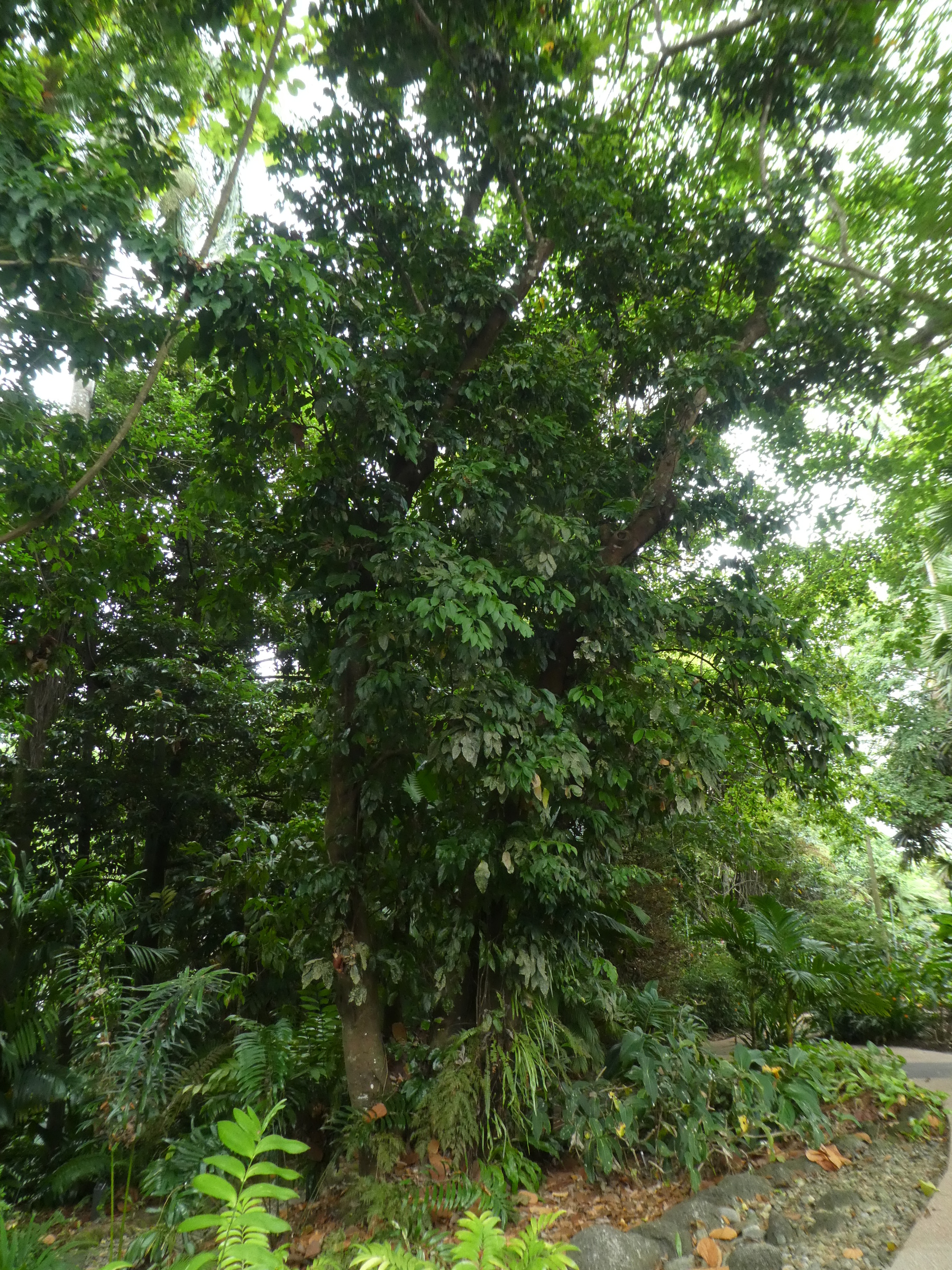
- In Cairns Botanic Gardens

Conservation status
- Least Concern (NCA)
- Least Concern (IUCN 3.1)

Scientific classification
- Kingdom: Plantae
- Clade: Tracheophytes
- Clade: Angiosperms
- Clade: Eudicots
- Order: Proteales
- Family: Proteaceae
- Genus: Carnarvonia
- Species: C. araliifolia

Binomial name
- Carnarvonia araliifolia F.Muell.

= Carnarvonia araliifolia =

Red oak

Species of flowering plant

Carnarvonia araliifolia, commonly known as the red oak, red silky oak, Caledonian oak or elephant's foot, is the sole species in the genus Carnarvonia, a member of the Proteaceae family. It is endemic to the rainforests of northeastern Queensland, Australia.

== Description ==
The red oak is a large tree growing to 30 m (98 ft) or more in height, and it may have small rounded buttress roots. These may give the lower trunk the appearance of an elephant's foot, and are the source of one of the common names for the species. The trunk bears numerous, closely spaced small lenticels.

The large compound leaves are divided pedately and are highly variable, having anything from 3 to 20 leaflets. They range in size from 5 to 50 cm (2 to 20 in) long, including the petiole. The leaves are arranged alternately on the branches.

The inflorescence is a panicle, produced either terminally, in the leaf axils, or directly from the branches or trunk (the last two cases are known as ramiflory and cauliflory, respectively). They develop between November and May.

The fruit is a woody follicle measuring up to 5 cm (2 in) long by 2.1 cm (0.8 in) wide, with the pedicel (stem) attached at one side. They contain one or two winged seeds up to 45 mm (1.8 in) long.

== Taxonomy ==
This species was first described by the German-born Australian botanist Ferdinand von Mueller, from a specimen collected by John Dallachy in the forested mountains around Rockingham Bay in Queensland. He published the description in volume 6 of his massive work Fragmenta phytographiæ Australiæ in 1867.

In 1995 the Australian botanist Bernard Hyland described a new variety of the species, C. a. var. montana, which was published in Flora of Australia volume 16. His description was based on a specimen he collected himself in 1972.

The species has been placed in the subfamily Grevilleoideae because its cotyledons have auricles, which is unique to the subfamily.

=== Etymology ===
The genus name Carnarvonia was given by Mueller to honour Henry Howard Molyneux Herbert, the Fourth Earl of Carnarvon. The species epithet araliifolia is a combination of the genus Aralia and the Latin word folium, 'leaf', and refers to the similarity of the leaves to those of some Aralia species.

== Distribution and habitat ==
The variety C. a. araliifolia is native to the coastal rainforests of northeastern Queensland, from Cooktown south to Ingham, and from near sea level up to about 1,000 m (3,280 ft). The other variety, C. a. monticola, has a smaller range from the Windsor Tablelands in the north to the southern edge of the Atherton Tableland, and in altitudes from 650 to 1,200 m (2,130 to 3,940 ft). Both varieties grow in well developed rainforest

== Ecology ==
The fruits are eaten by sulphur-crested cockatoos (Cacatua galerita) and cassowaries (Casuarius casuarius).

== Conservation ==
This species is listed by both the Queensland Department of Environment and Science and the IUCN as least concern.

== Uses ==
The timber of C. araliifolia has a rich red colour and is hard wearing. It has been used in house construction, especially for polished floors.

== Gallery ==
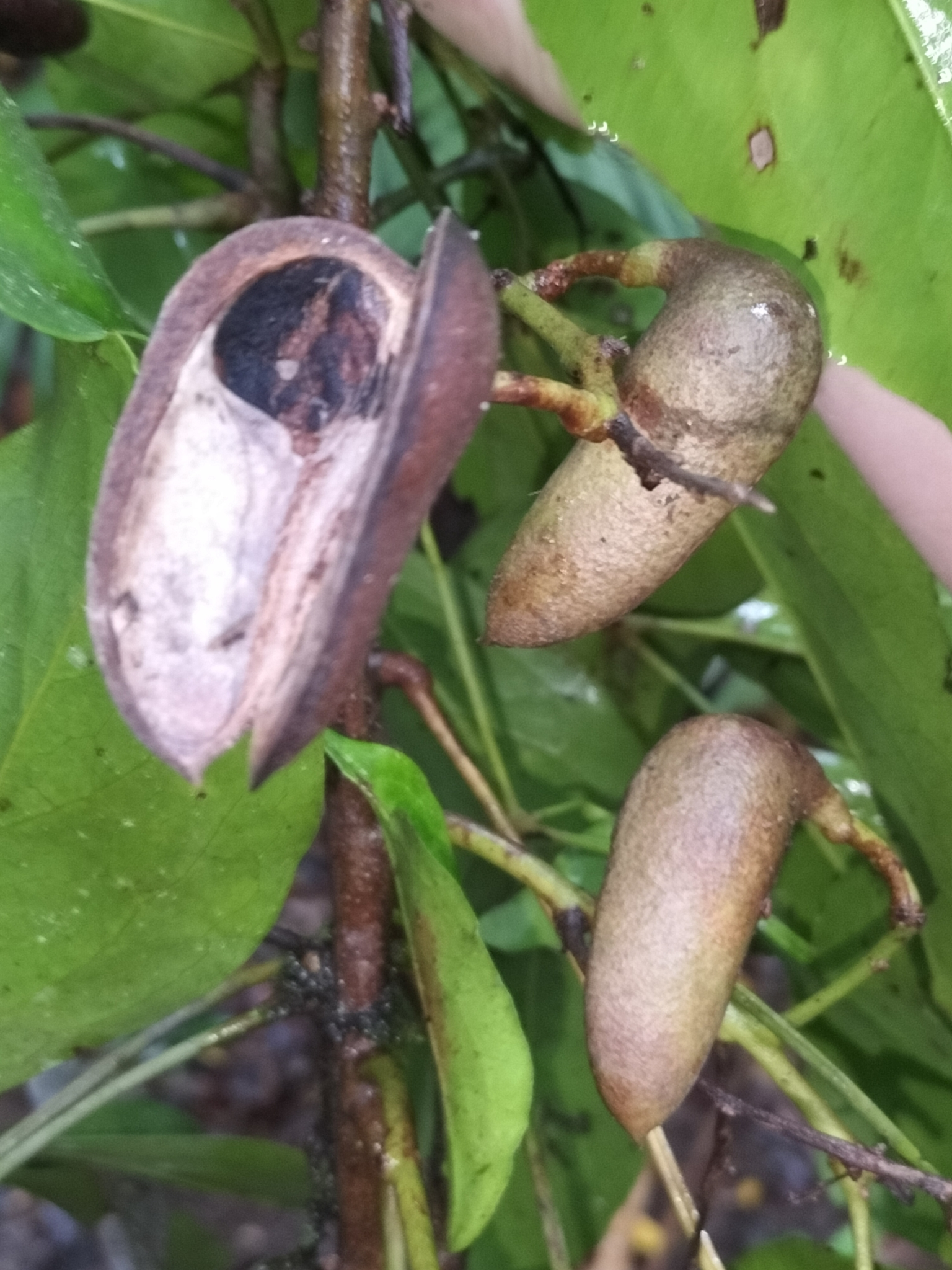
Fruit

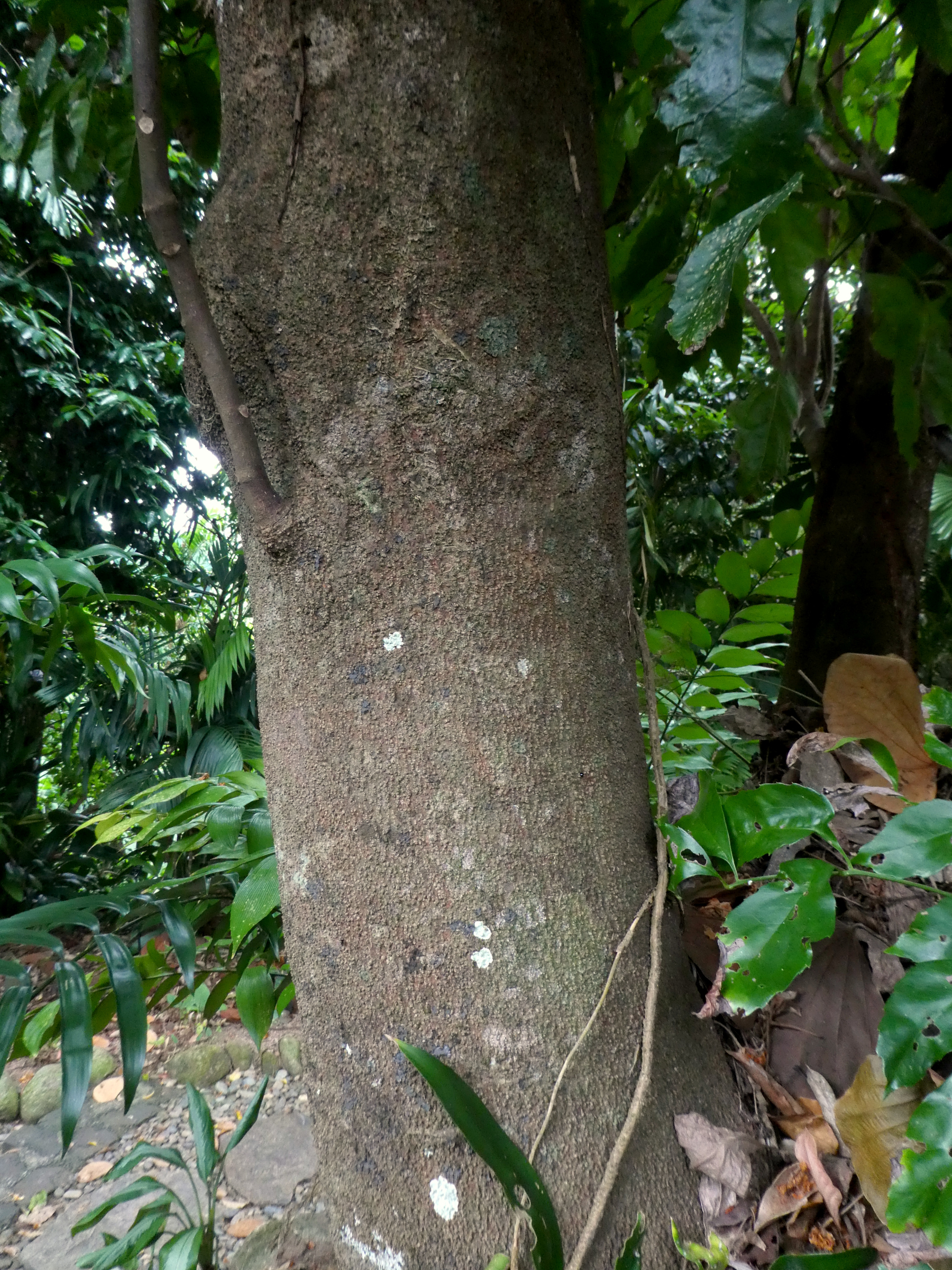
Trunk

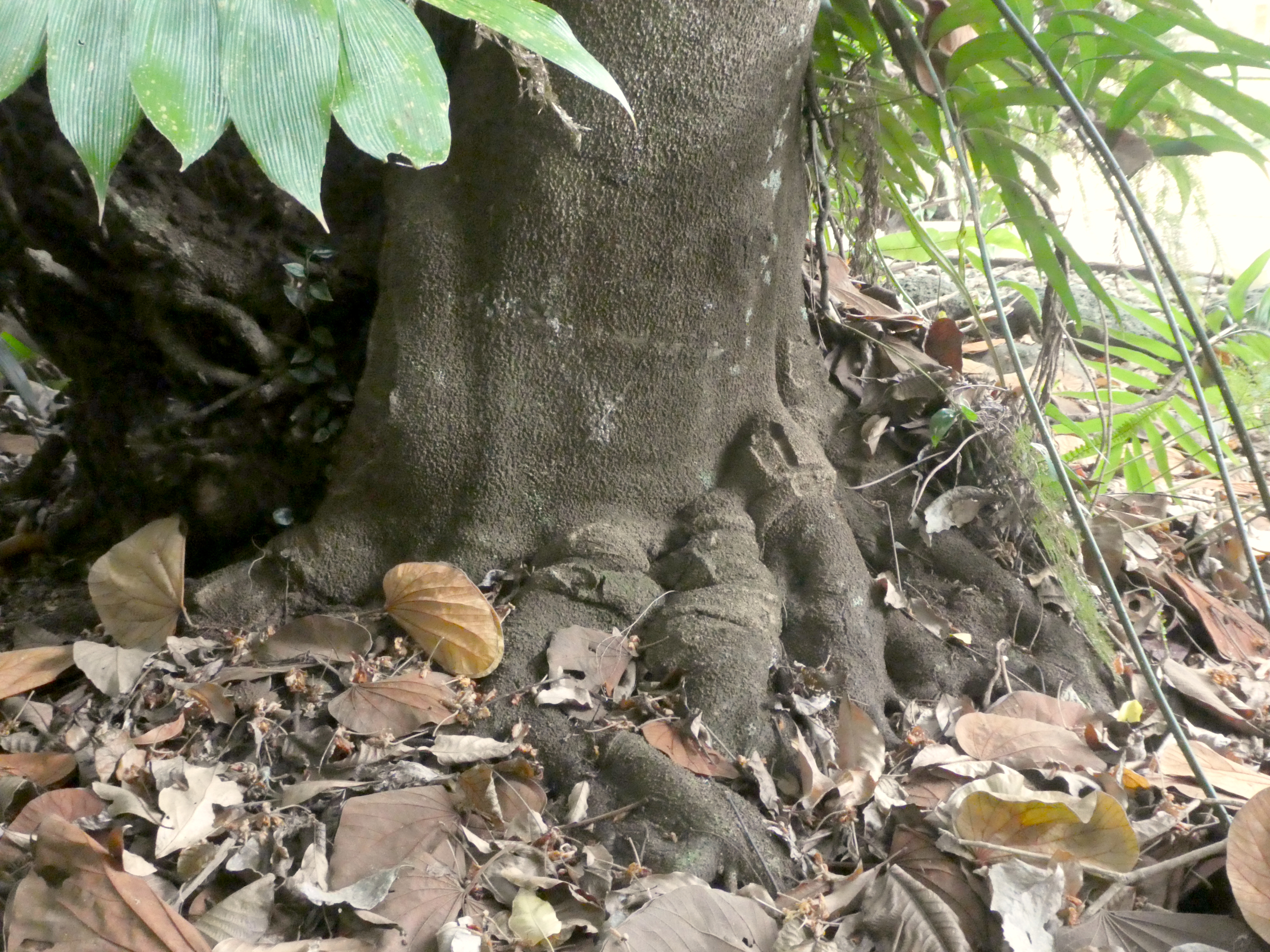
Small rounded buttresses

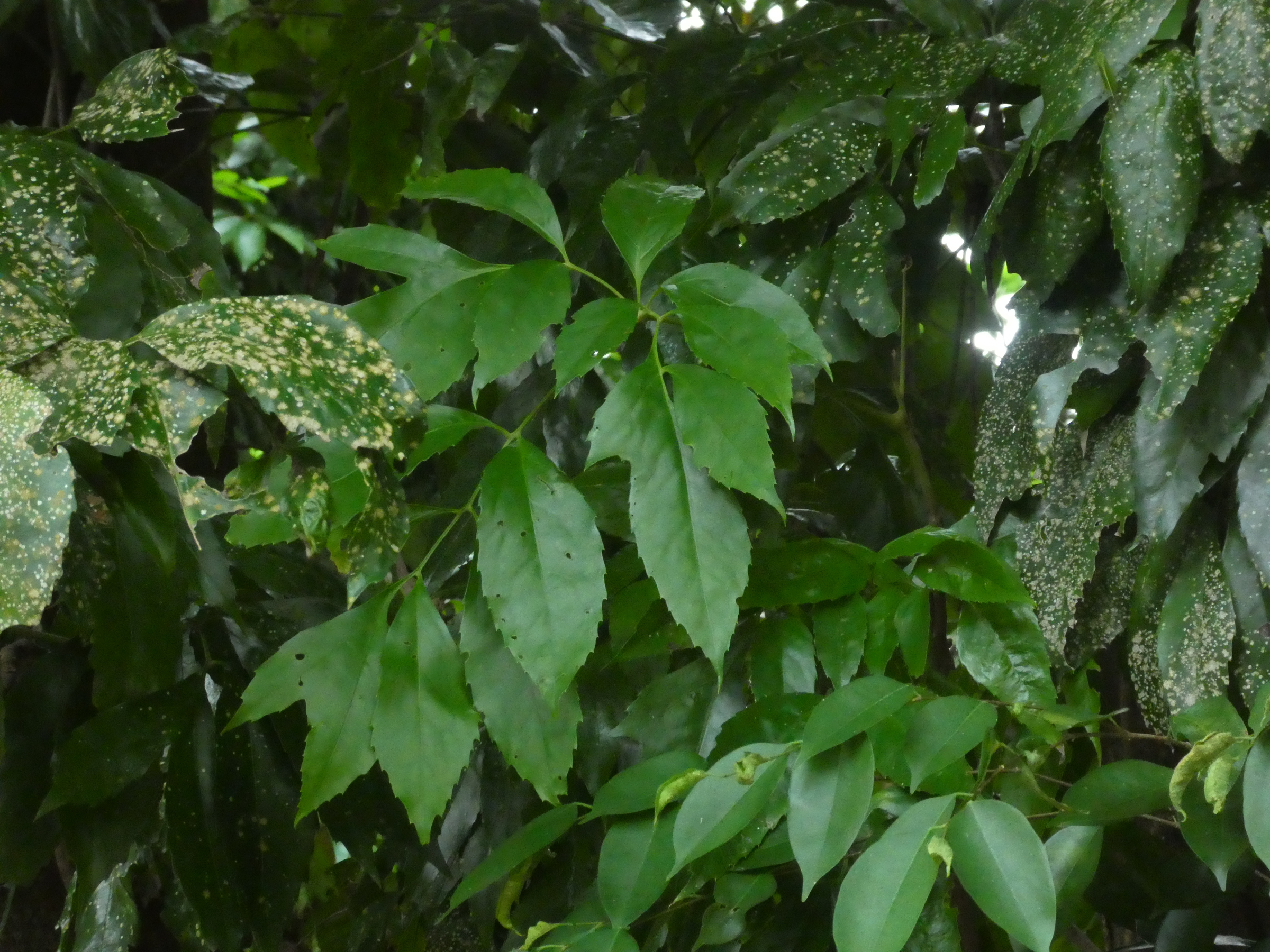
Foliage

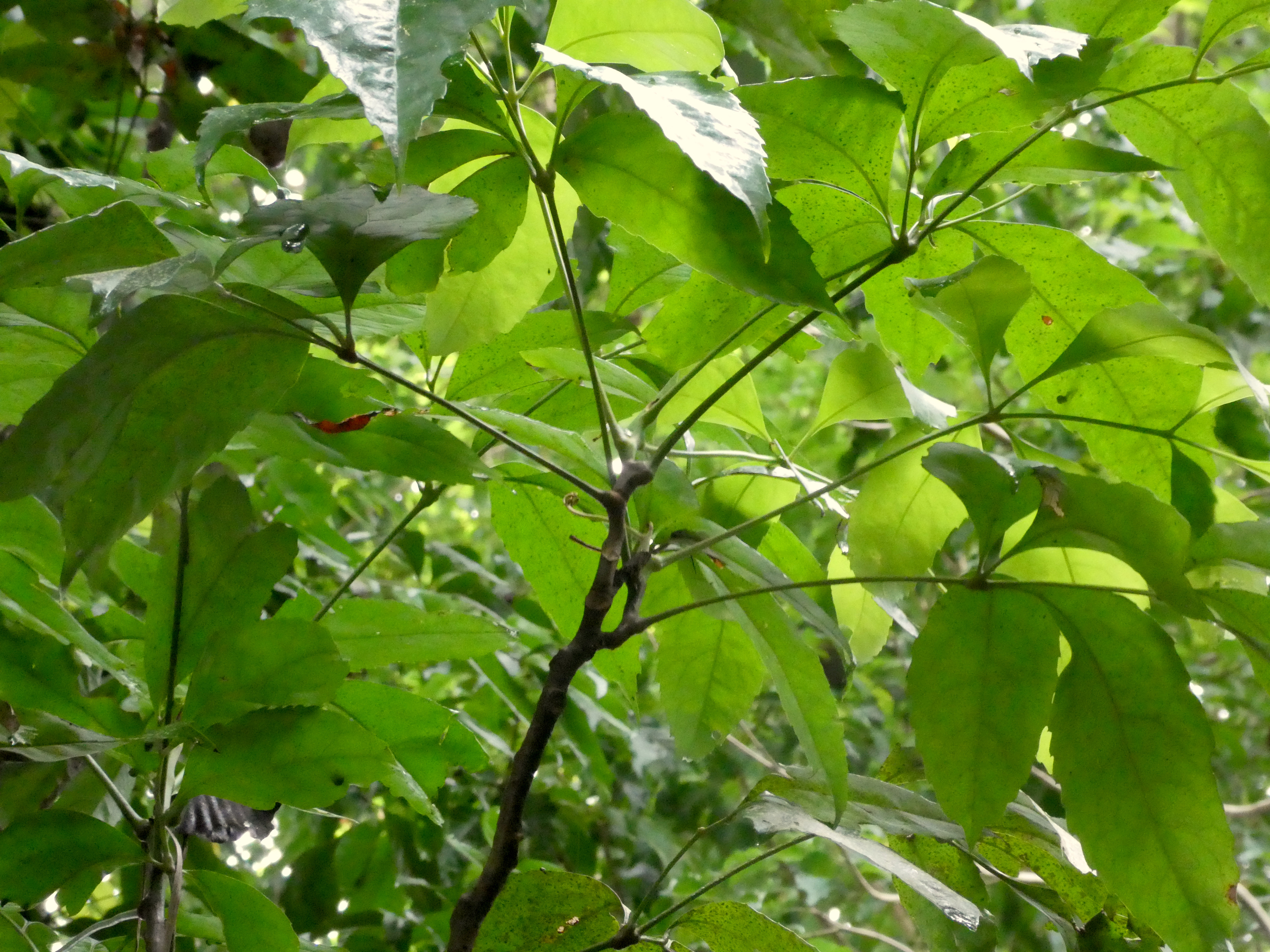
Foliage

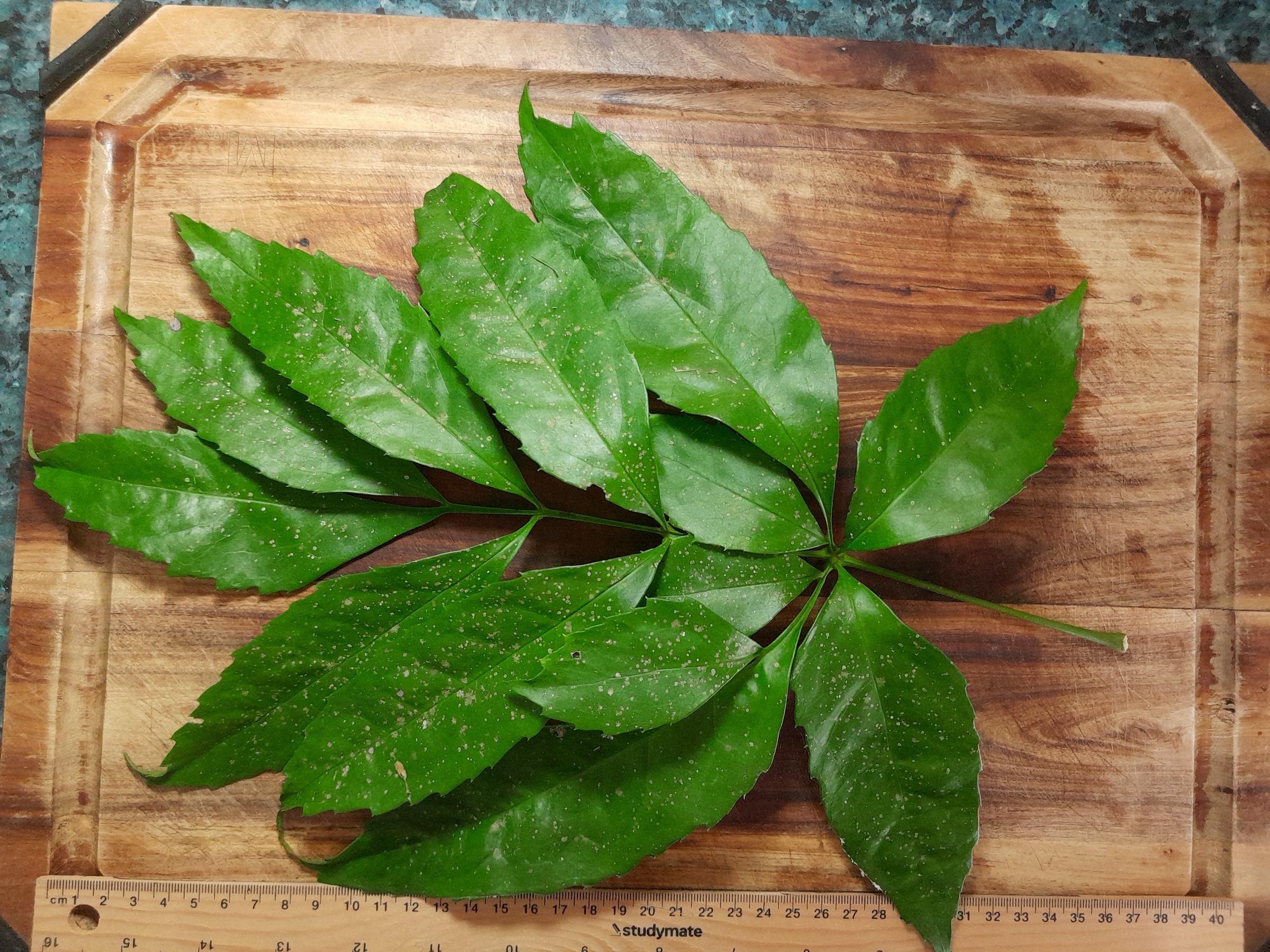
Compound leaf, upper side, with 13 leaflets

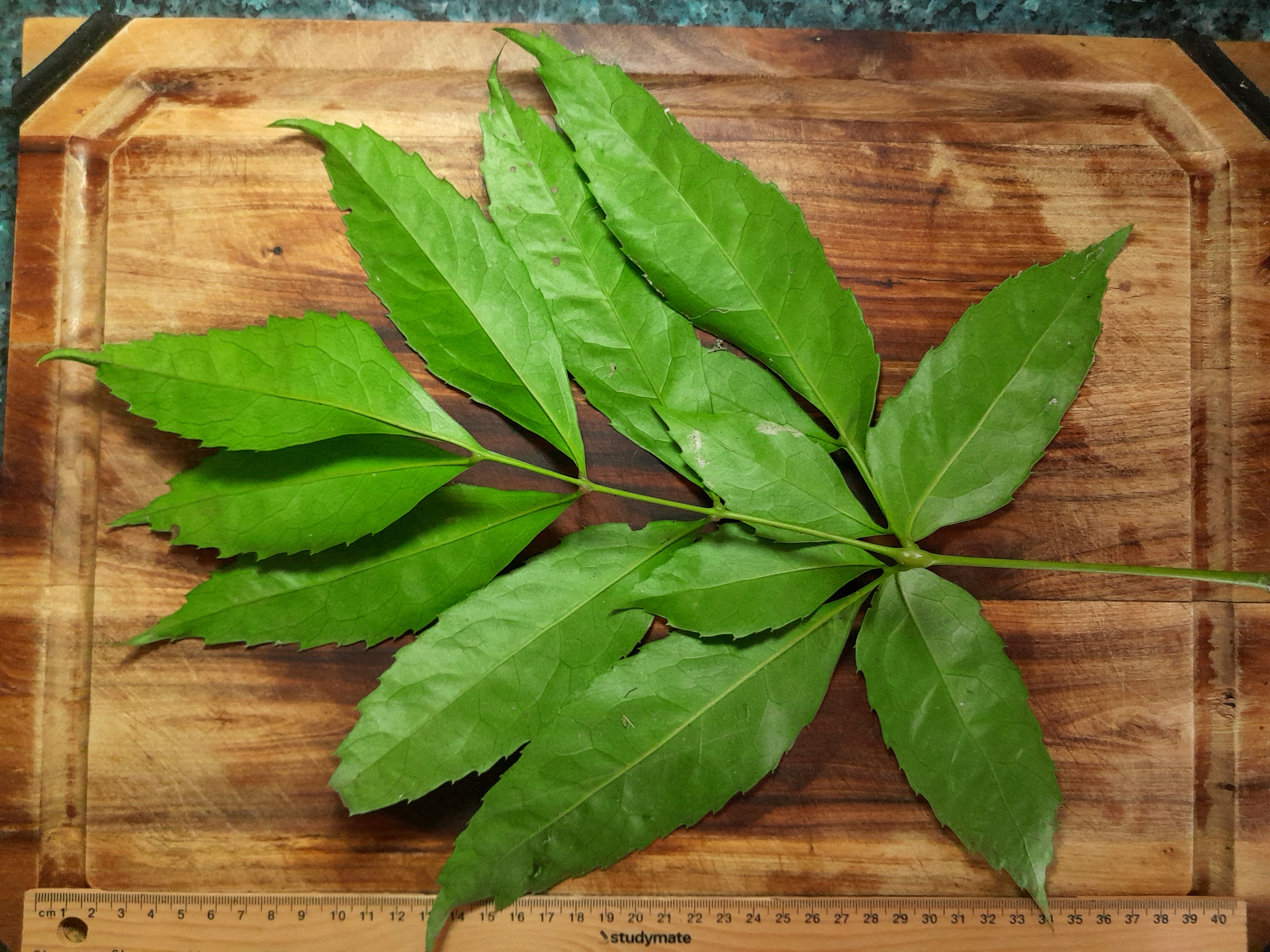
Under side of leaf
