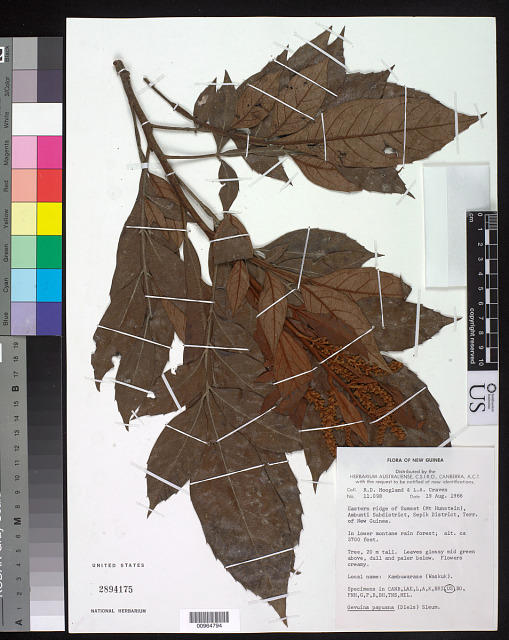
- Bleasdalea papuana

Scientific classification
- Kingdom: Plantae
- Clade: Tracheophytes
- Clade: Angiosperms
- Clade: Eudicots
- Order: Proteales
- Family: Proteaceae
- Subfamily: Grevilleoideae
- Tribe: Macadamieae
- Subtribe: Gevuininae
- Genus: Bleasdalea; F.Muell. ex Domin

Species
- See text

= Bleasdalea =

Genus of flowering plants

Bleasdalea is a genus of flowering plants in the family Proteaceae.

== Taxonomy ==
Molecular and morphological analysis shows this genus is most closely related to the genus Hicksbeachia, ancestors of the two genera having diverged around 15 million years ago in the Miocene.

=== Species ===
The genus comprises two species which are native to northeastern Australia and New Guinea:

- Bleasdalea bleasdalei (F.Muell.) A.C.Sm. & J.E.Haas
- Bleasdalea papuana (Diels) Domin
