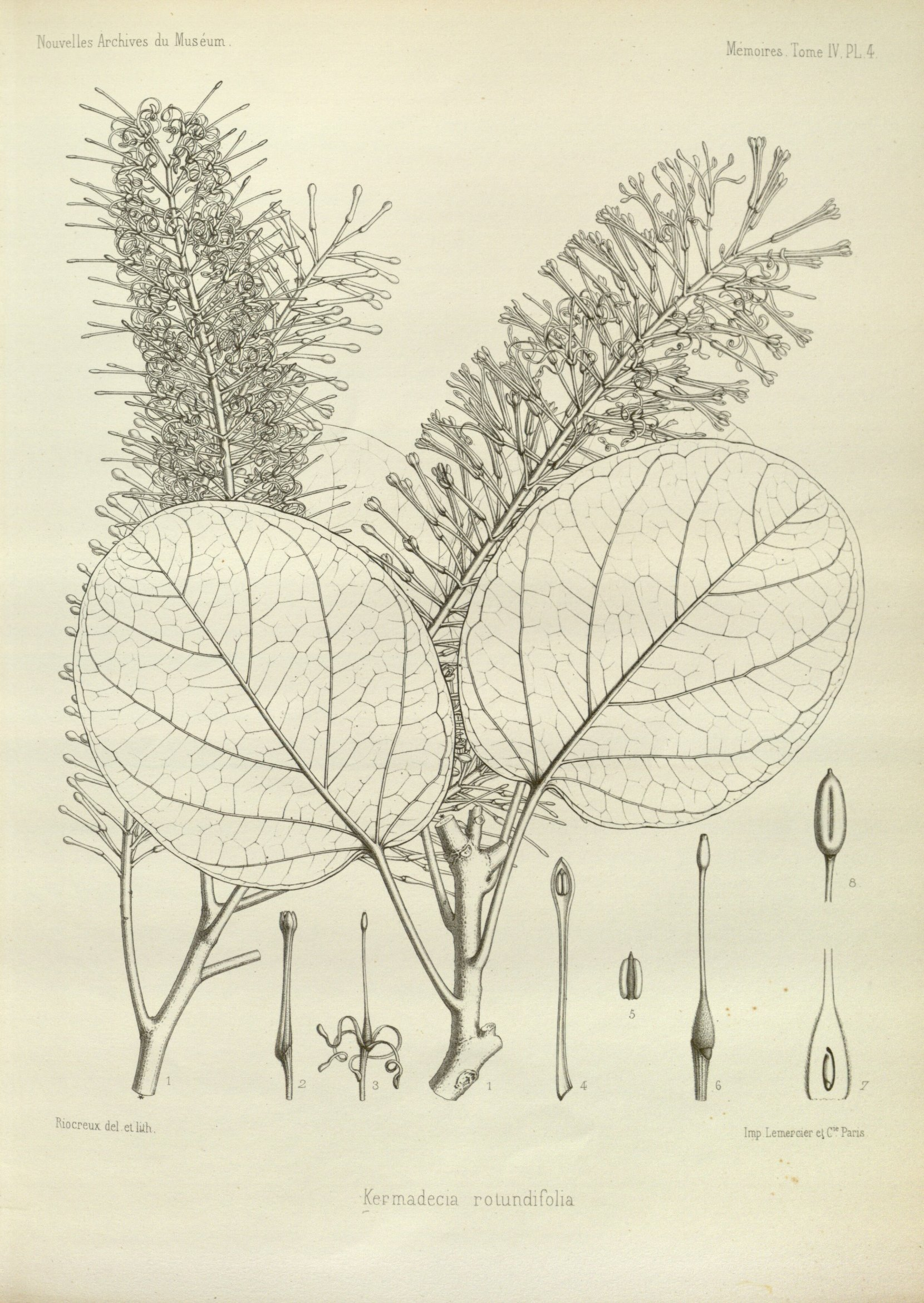
- Kermadecia rotundifolia

Scientific classification
- Kingdom: Plantae
- Clade: Embryophytes
- Clade: Tracheophytes
- Clade: Angiosperms
- Clade: Eudicots
- Order: Proteales
- Family: Proteaceae
- Subfamily: Grevilleoideae
- Tribe: Macadamieae
- Subtribe: Gevuininae
- Genus: Kermadecia; Brongn. & Gris

Synonyms
- Sleumerodendron Virot; Turrillia A.C.Sm.

= Kermadecia =

Genus of plants endemic to New Caledonia

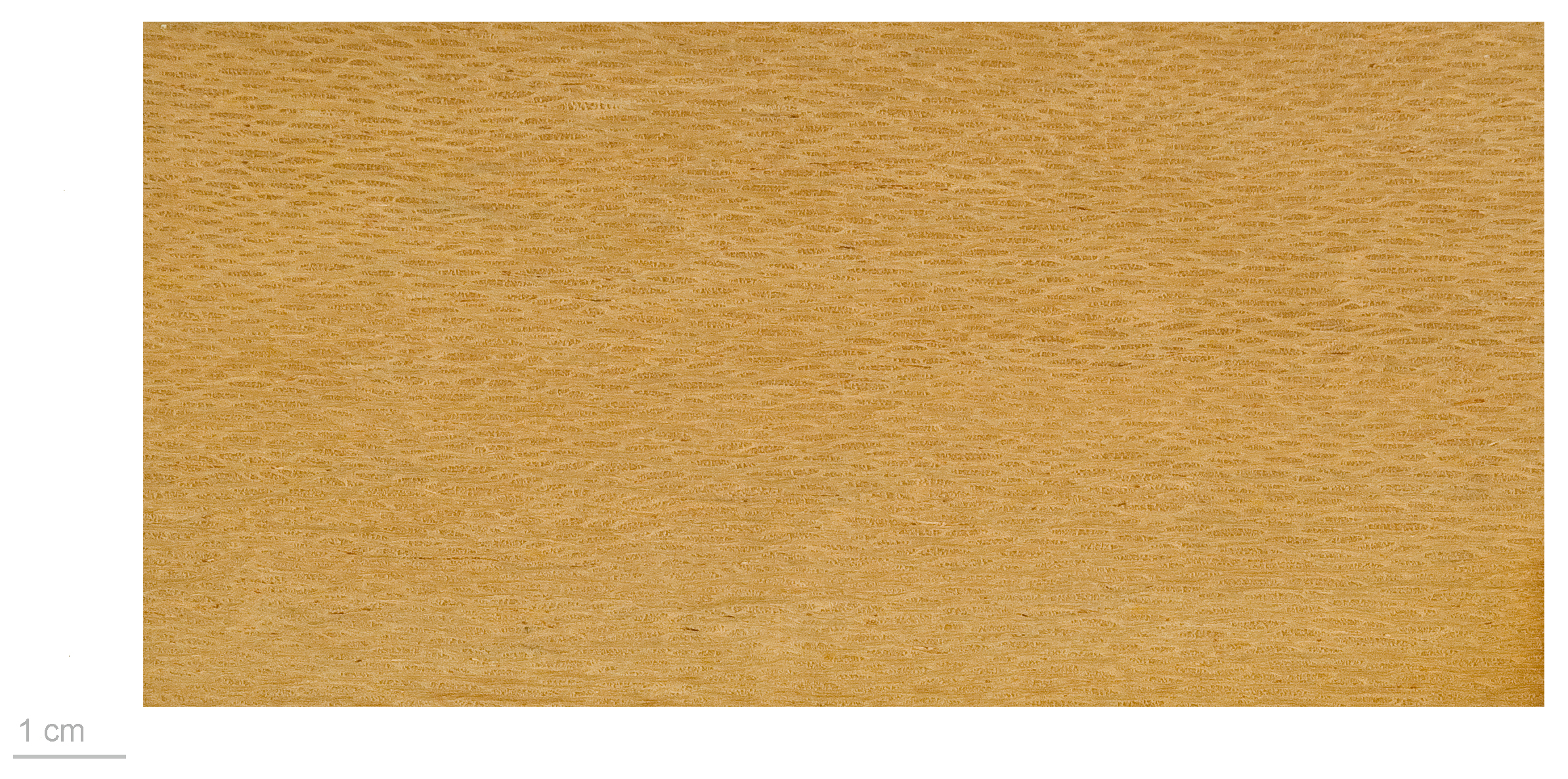
Kermadecia sinuata wood - MHNT

Kermadecia is a genus of flowering plants in the family Proteaceae. The genus comprises eight species of rainforest trees from New Caledonia, Fiji, and Vanuatu. Its closest relative is Euplassa from South America.

== Species ==
- Kermadecia austrocaledonica (Brongn. & Gris) Benth. & Hook.f. ex B.D.Jacks., New Caledonia
- Kermadecia brinoniae H.C.Hopkins & Pillon, New Caledonia
- Kermadecia ferruginea A.C.Sm., Fiji
- Kermadecia lutea Guillaumin, Vanuatu
- Kermadecia pronyensis (Guillaumin) Guillaumin, New Caledonia
- Kermadecia rotundifolia Brongn. & Gris, New Caledonia
- Kermadecia sinuata Brongn. & Gris, New Caledonia
- Kermadecia vitiensis Turrill, Fiji
