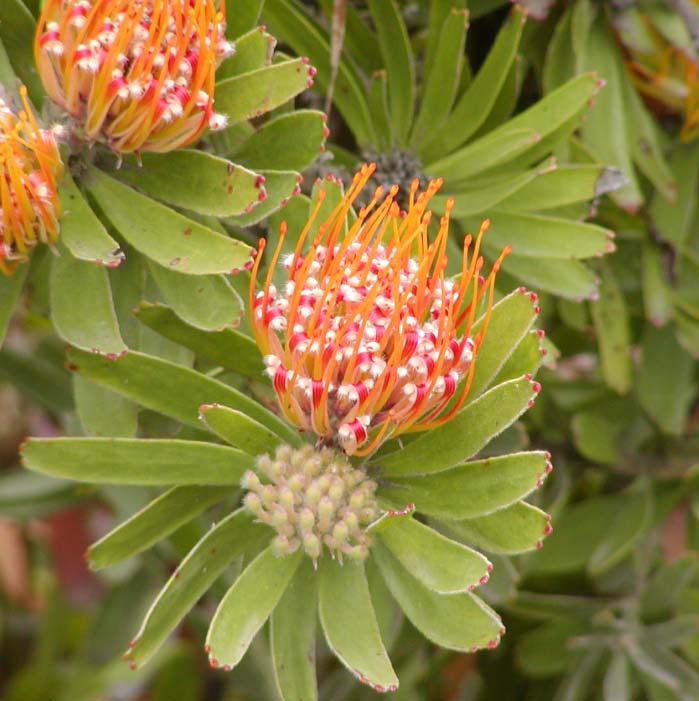
- Leucospermum erubescens

Scientific classification
- Kingdom: Plantae
- Clade: Embryophytes
- Clade: Tracheophytes
- Clade: Angiosperms
- Clade: Eudicots
- Order: Proteales
- Family: Proteaceae
- Subfamily: Proteoideae
- Tribe: Leucadendreae
- Subtribe: Leucadendrinae
- Genus: Leucospermum; R.Br.

Type species
- Leucospermum hypophyllocarpodendron (L.) Druce
- native range

Synonyms
- Conocarpus Adans. non L.; Lepidocarpus Adans.; Leucadendrum Salisb. in Knight; Leucadendron O.Kuntze non L.

= Leucospermum =

Genus of shrubs

Leucospermum, commonly known as pincushions, is a genus of evergreen upright, sometimes creeping shrubs that is assigned to the Proteaceae, with currently 48 known species.

The shrubs mostly have a single stem at their base, but some species sprout from an underground rootstock, from which the plant can regrow after fire has killed the above ground biomass. In a larger group of species, specimens are killed by fire, and their survival depends on the seeds. In all species, seeds are collected by ants, which take them to their underground nests to feed on their ant breads, a seed dispersal strategy known as myrmecochory. This ensures that the seeds do not burn, so new plants can grow from them.

Leucospermum species mostly have seated, simple, mostly leathery, often softly hairy leaves, set in a spiral, with entire margins or more often, with 3–17 blunt teeth with thickened, bony tips, and without stipules at their foot. The flowers are organised with many together in heads with bracts on the under- or outside. The hermaphrodite flowers themselves are set on a common base that may be cylindrical, conical or flat, and have small bracts at their base. The flowers have a perianth that is hairy on the outside, particularly at the tip, and consists of four tepals that are merged into a tube. Usually the four anthers are merged individually with the tip the perianth lobes, and only in a few species, a very short filament is present that further down cannot be distinguished from the tepals anymore. While still in the bud, the pollen is transferred from the anthers to the pollen-presenter, a thickening at the tip of the style. At that stage, the style grows considerably and rips through the sutures between the two perianth lobes facing away from the centre of the flower head. The perianth lobes all four remain attached to each other, or with three, or the four free lobes all curl back on themselves (like the lid of a sardine can), rimming the top of the tube. The superior ovary consists of one carpel and contains a single ovary, and is subtended by four small scales. The fruit is an oval or almost globe-shaped nut.

Most species have very limited ecological ranges and distribution areas, and many are rare or endangered. The often attractive, large flower heads and evergreen foliage, the straight stems, combined with long flowering period makes that Leucospermum species and their hybrids are bred as garden ornamental and cut flower.

== Description ==
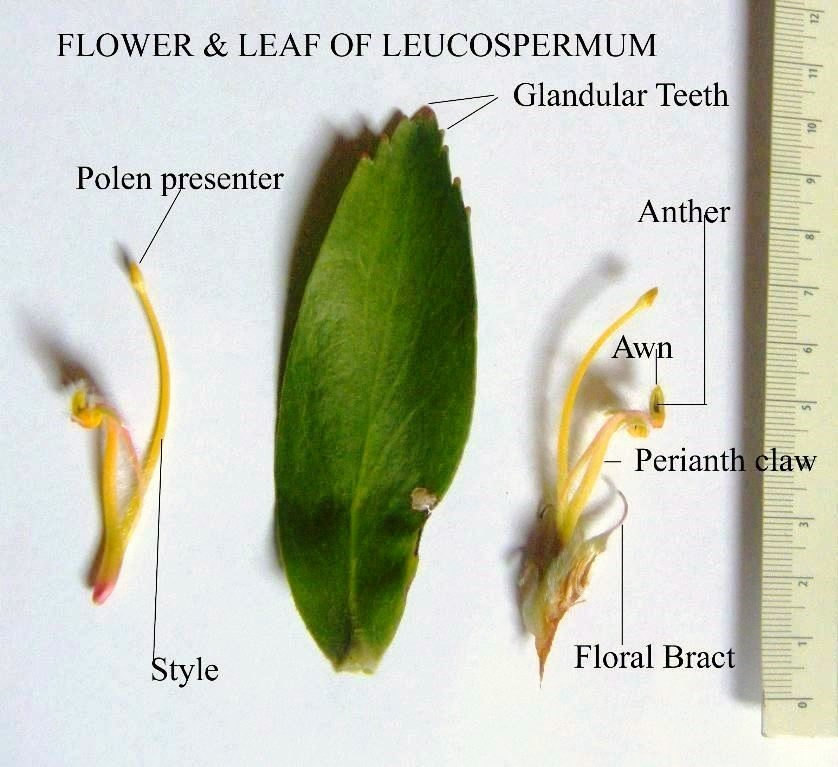
Morphology of the individual flower and leaf

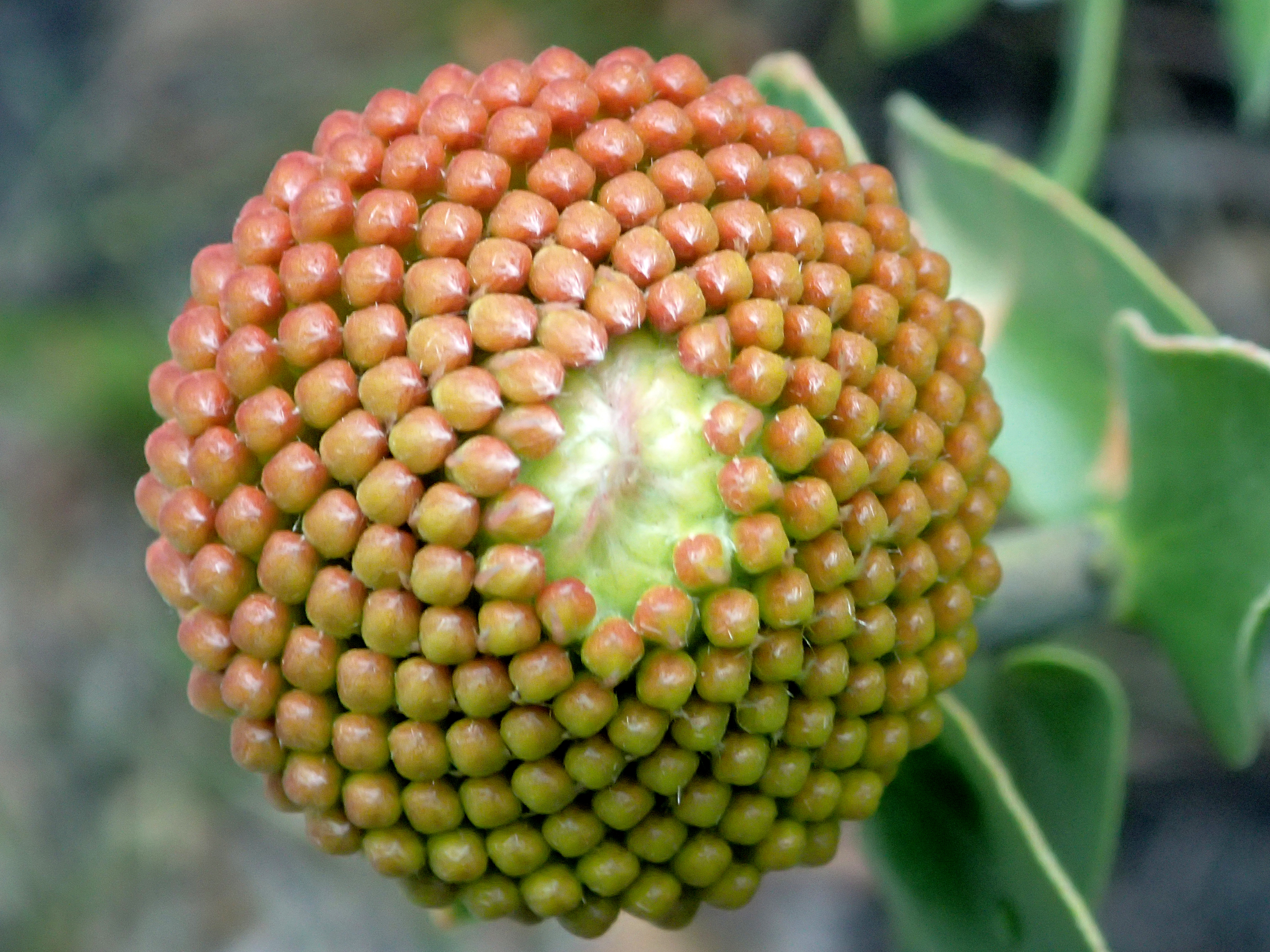
The positioning of flower buds on the receptacle as seen from above

Most pincushions are upright shrubs or even small trees of 1–5 m (3.3–16.4 ft) high, that usually have a single main stem. Some species however only have trailing branches and can form low mats, 1–5 m (3.3–16.4 ft) in diameter. Yet another set of species grow several stems directly from a rootstock in the ground. This is an important character in distinguishing between some species. Dried specimens of L. pedunculatum and L. prostratum can be difficult to distinguish, but although both are prostrate species, the growth habits in the field differ considerably. In L. pedunculatum many horizontally spreading branches develop from an about 30 cm (12 in) main stem, in L. prostratum the branches rise from an underground woody rootstock. The leaves are alternately set along the stem, distanced and slightly pointing towards the tip of the branch or overlapping, mostly without, sometimes with a leaf stalk but always without stipules at their base, 1.5–14 cm (0.59–5.51 in) long and linear, elliptic, oblanceolate, oval, inverted egg-shaped or spade-shaped, the edge entire or with up to 17 teeth towards the tip, hairless or with a covering of soft cringy one-celled hairs, sometime interspersed with longer straight silky hairs.

The flower heads are seated or have a short stalk, and grow individually in species with large heads or with two to ten together in species with smaller heads, in the axils of the leaves near the end of the branches. The general shape of the heads is a flattened, round, egg- or cone-shaped sphere of 2–15 cm (0.79–5.91 in) in diameter. The position not at the very tip of the branches helps to distinguish Leucospermum from related genera such as Diastella, while the more than one head per branch helps to distinguish the sections Diastelloides and Hamatum from the other sections. The involucral bracts are green in fresh specimens, and inconspicuous. They may have different shapes such as linear or ovate, with a sharp or pointed tip. In the majority of the species the involucral bracts have tough rubbery consistency and are usually softly hairy, overlapping and tightly pressed against the flower head. L. parile, L. tottum and L. vestitum on the other hand have thin, papery bracts. The common base of the flowers that jointly constitute a single flowerhead (called receptacle) varies considerably among species. It may be flat, globe-shaped, pointy conical or blunt cylindric. This character can best be seen by cutting a flower head lengthwise in two equal halves.

The individual flowers are subtended by a bract (or bracteole) that is wooly at its foot and softly hairy or hairless near the tip. Sometimes it grows on while the flower is in bloom and eventually becomes woody. While still in the bud, the perianth is a tube of 1.5–5.5 cm (0.59–2.17 in) long. When flowering, the perianth is yellow, orange, crimson, pink or white in color, straight or often curved towards the center of the flower head. The perianth consists of four tepals that are fused into a tube of 0.3–1.0 cm (0.12–0.39 in) either of uniform width or expanding towards the tip, but there are also a few species where it is inflated nearer the tip, such as in L. utriculosum, L. hamatum and L. harpagonatum. Above the tube, three of the lobes may become fused in a sheath, open towards the outside of the flower head, while the lobe facing the rim of the flower head is free. In the upper part of the perianth (or limbs) all four lobes may remain fused or only the three that remained already fused in the middle part. In the section Diastelloidea all four lobes are free in the upper parts and curl back forming a four-part rim around the top of the tube. The anthers differ little between species of Leucospermum and are usually fused with the tips of the perianth lobes, and filaments cannot be identified, but in the species that constitute the section Brevifilamentum, a filament of 1–1.1 mm (0.039–0.043 in) long makes the connection between the anther and the lobe. The buds are ripped open along a suture facing away from the center of the flower head by the style that grows in length quickly, eventually reaching a length of 1–8 cm (0.39–3.15 in), straight or with a curve towards the center of the flower head, 1–2 mm (0.039–0.079 in) in diameter, often narrower nearer to the tip or thread-shaped, mostly identically colored as the perianth. The end of the style is (sometimes only slightly) thickened and holds the pollen that is transferred there just before the bud rips open. There is a considerable morphological variation in this so-called pollen presenter between species. The pollen presenter may be cylindric, oval, or conic in shape, either or not split in two lobes near the tip or oblique. The very tip has a groove that functions as the stigma that is centrally or oblique oriented. The finely powdery ovary is 1–2 mm (0.039–0.079 in) long, and gradually merges into the style base. It consists of one carpel and contains a single pendulous ovule. At the base of the ovary are four linear or awl-shaped scales of 1–3 mm (0.039–0.118 in) long that secrete a copious amount of nectar.

The indehiscent fruit consists of one cavity, containing one oval to globe-shaped seed of 4–8 mm (0.16–0.31 in) long, with a broad indent where it was attached, hairless or covered with a fine powder and generally partially covered by a pale elaiosome.

The sixteen Leucospermum species that have been analysed are all diploids having twelve sets of homologue chromosomes (2n=24), which is consistent with the rest of the subtribe Proteinae.

=== Differences with related genera ===
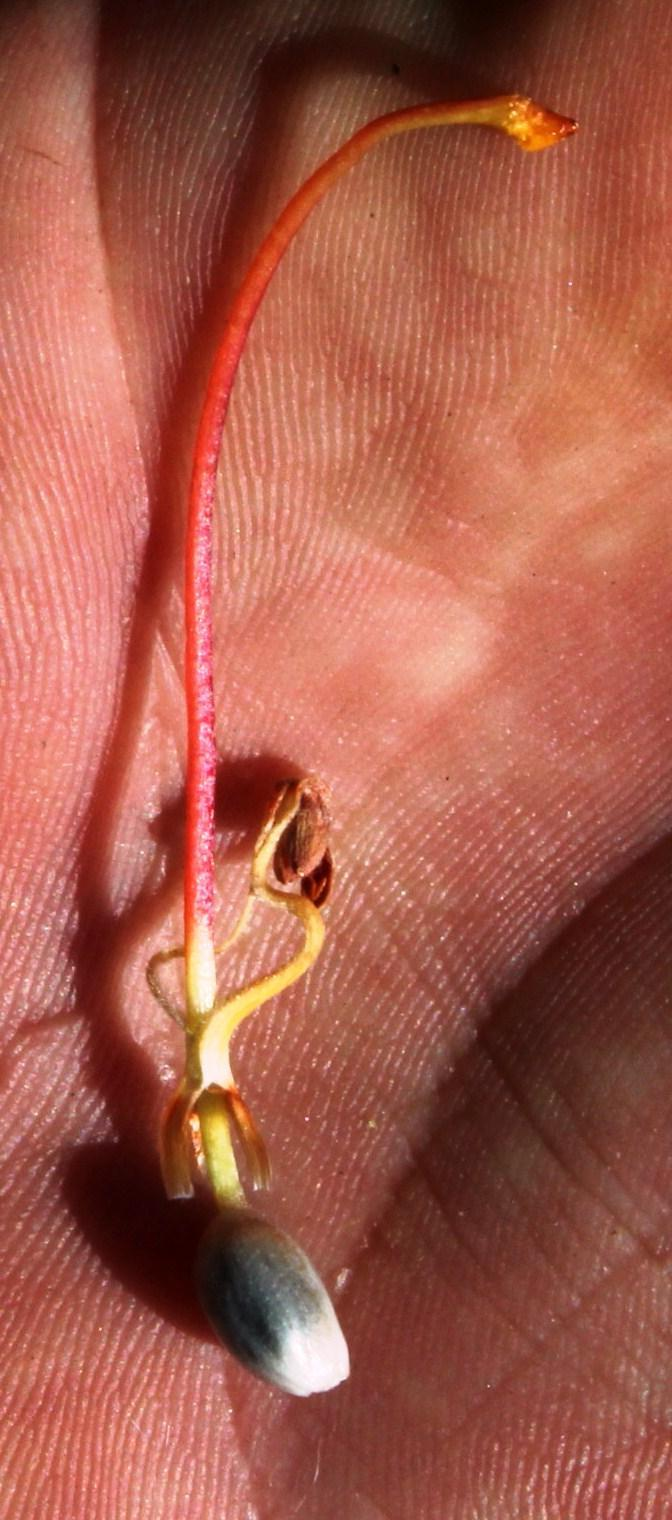
Detail of an individual flower showing the white fruit that the genus is named after. Photo: Tony Rebelo.

Leucospermum differs from genera such as Protea, Leucadendron, Mimetes, Diastella, Paranomus, Serruria, and Orothamnus by having the flower heads in the axils of the leaves (although often very near the tip of the branch), small and inconspicuous bracts subtending the head, brightly coloured styles that are straight or curve toward the center of the flower head and extend far from the perianth, giving the flower head the appearance of a pincushion, and large nut-like fruits covered by a pale and soft layer that attracts ants. The style breaks out of the bud at the side facing the rim of the head, and the perianth lobes may stick together with four or three forming a sheath, or roll back individually.

=== Sections ===
Currently, the genus is subdivided in nine sections based on morphological communalities and differences.

==== Brevifilamentum ====
The six species of the section Brevifilamentum are sometimes called showy pincushions, and include several horticultural species. The species all share a character that is unique in the genus Leucospermum: their anthers top a short, 1–1.5 mm (0.039–0.059 in) long filament that attach the anthers to the perianth, while in all other sections the anthers are directly fused with the limbs of the perianth lobes. The common base of the flowers in one head (or involucral receptacle) as can be seen by cutting lengthwise through a head is very narrowly conical with a sharp tip. The pollen presenter is egg-shaped, obliquely egg-shaped or hoof-shaped.

==== Cardinistyle ====
The six species that are assigned to the section Cardinistyle are sometimes called fireworks pincushions. They are all large upright shrubs, with only one main stem. The common base of the flowers is a narrow cone with a pointy tip. The flowers have styles of 5.5–8 cm (2.2–3.1 in) long that move downward when the flowers open, and are topped by a narrow pollen presenter ending in a sharp tip. L. reflexum has oval or narrowly oval greyish, felty leaves of 2–5.5 cm (0.79–2.17 in) long and 0.5–1.3 cm (0.20–0.51 in) wide. The perianth is yellow or scarlet 4–5 cm (1.6–2.0 in) long, and a style uniquely pointing downwards when the flower is open.

==== Conocarpodendron ====
The three species and one subspecies of the section Conocarpodendron are sometimes called tree pincushions. They are all small trees of up to 4 m (13 ft) high with a single trunk. The common base of the flowers in the same head is conical or narrowly conical with a pointy tip. The styles are 5–6 cm (2.0–2.4 in) long that carries a narrowly conical pollen presenter with a pointy tip. The bracts that subtend the flower heads are pointed and may have a hooked tip.

==== Crassicaudex ====
The four species assigned to the section Crassicaudex are sometimes called cylindric pincushions. These four all have a cylinder-shaped common base of the flowers in the same head. All are upright shrubs with several main stems that rise up from a woody rootstock underground. This makes the species very tolerant to fire. The leaves are wedge-shaped. All three species that occur outside the Cape Floral Region are assigned to this section.

==== Crinitae ====
The four species of the section Crinitae are sometimes called flat pincushions. They are upright or spreading shrubs. The involucral receptacle is always flat and 2–4 cm (0.79–1.57 in) in diameter with bowl-shaped flower heads. The lobes of the perianth remain erect after flowering and do not curl back as usual in other sections. The styles are thread-like and the flowers change color conspicuously when aging. L. saxatile is a creeper with 2–5 mm (0.079–0.197 in) wide leaves and lime-green flowers. L. gracile is also a prostrate shrub with 2–5 mm wide leaves, but its flowers are yellow. L. oleifolium has leaves 10–85 mm (0.39–3.35 in) wide that are mostly entire but sometimes have up to five teeth, and with flowers that are pale yellow at first but become crimson with age. L. mundii is an upright shrub with two distinct populations, one with leaves 10–85 mm (0.39–3.35 in) wide that have 7–17 teeth at their tip, flowers pale yellow aging to orange.

==== Diastelloidea ====
The species of the section Diastelloidea are sometimes called louse pincushions. They may be upright, spreading or creeping shrubs, that usually have sharply pointed leaves without teeth at the tip. The flowerheads are small and globe-shaped, mostly with two to six together very close to the tip of the branches, 1–3 cm (0.39–1.18 in) in diameter. The involucral receptacle is never flat. The style is 1–2.5 cm (0.39–0.98 in) long, topped by a club-shaped, cylindric or rounded conical pollen presenter. The colour of the flower changes when ageing, from cream to pink or from yellow to orange. All four perianth lobes curl back individually to form four small rolls surrounding the style, and these rolled lobes are said to resemble lice.

==== Hamatum ====
The species of the section Hamatum are sometimes called hook pincushions. Both species are trailing, mat-forming species with stiff, narrow, erect leaves and have small heads with between four and twelve flowers in one whorl. The perianth tubes are inflated towards the upper end and the styles are beset by very small teeth facing towards the base, strongly curved towards the center of the head, making the head reminiscent of a grappling hook. L. hamatum has linear leaves mostly with three teeth near the tip, a poorly developed or absent involucre, but four or five very large bracts forming a pseudo-involucre subtending the four to seven flowers per head. The perianth is hairless. L. harpagonatum has entire (narrowly) linear leaves, a well-developed involucre consisting of 25–35 bracts (subtending the flower head as a whole), eight to rarely twelve flowers per head, the perianth tubes densely wooly in the upper part.

==== Leucospermum ====
The species assigned to the section Leucospermum are sometimes called sandveld pincushions. Among it are both upright, spreading and creeping shrubs, and leaf-shapes vary from line- to egg- and wedge-shaped, but they all have felty hairy leaves, even when aged. The bud is usually straight, always with a sweet scent and colored brightly yellow. In the open flower, the three perianth lobes at the side of the center of the flower head remain attached, while the remaining lobe is free. The pollen presenter at the tip of the style is cylindrical or club-shaped.

==== Tumiditubus ====
The species assigned to the section Tumiditubus are sometimes called wide-tubed pincushions. All eight of them are erect or spreading shrubs with one main stem. All of them have a conical or wide-conical common base of the flowers within one head. The base of lowest, fully fused part of the flower (called tube) is narrow and gets wider towards the upper end.

== Taxonomy ==
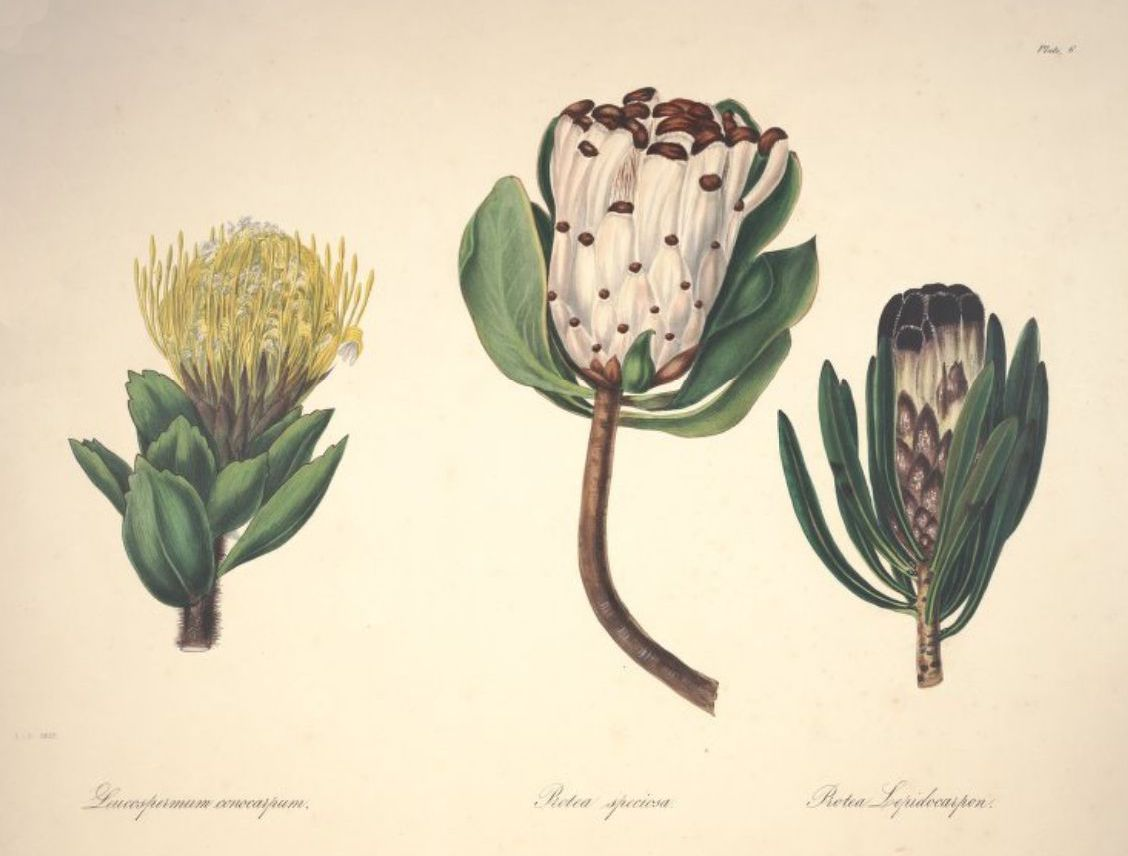
Early etching of Leucospermum conocarpodendron (left) and two Protea species by Arabella Elizabeth Roupell

The earliest known description from a species we now include in the genus Leucospermum was by Paul Hermann in Paradisus Batavus, a book describing the plants of the Hortus Botanicus Leiden (botanical garden of the Leyden University), that was published in 1689, three years after his death. He called it Salix conophora Africana (African cone-bearing willow), based on his observation of Leucospermum conocarpodendron on the lower slopes of the Table Mountain. In the following six decades, several other descriptions were published, such as by Leonard Plukenet, James Petiver, John Ray and Herman Boerhaave. Names published before 1753, the year that was chosen as a starting point for the binominal nomenclature proposed by Carl Linnaeus, are not valid however.

The first valid names were already created that very year with the publication of the first edition of Species Plantarum, with the description of two species, Leucadendron conocarpodendron and Leucadendron hypophyllocarpodendron (now Leucospermum conocarpodendron and L. hypophyllocarpodendron) by Linnaeus. In 1763, Michel Adanson also described several Proteaceae species, and did so under the generic names Lepidocarpus and Conocarpus. Four more species were described, by Linnaeus (Protea pubera and P. totta in 1771, now L. calligerum and L. tottum), Peter Jonas Bergius (Leucadendron oleaefolium 1766, now Leucospermum oleifolium) and Nicolaas Laurens Burman (Leucadendron cuneiforme, now Leucospermum cuneiforme), before Carl Peter Thunberg in 1781 published a revision containing nine species now included in Leucospermum, including Protea heterophylla and P. tomentosa (now L. heterophyllum and L. tomentosum). Further species were added by Jean-Baptiste Lamarck: Protea vestita 1792 (now L. vestitum), Thunberg: P. prostrata in 1794 (now L. prostratum), Henry Cranke Andrews: Protea formosa 1798 (now L. formosum), and P. candicans in 1803 (now Leucospermum rodolentum) a later homonym of P. candicans Thunb. 1800 (now Paranomus candicans), and in The Paradisus Londinensis by botanical illustrator William Hooker and botanist Richard Anthony Salisbury: Leucadendrum grandiflorum in 1808 (now Leucospermum grandiflorum).

Joseph Knight published a book in 1809 titled On the cultivation of the plants belonging to the natural order of Proteeae, that contained an extensive revision of the Proteaceae attributed to Salisbury. Salisbury assigned twenty-four species to his new genus Leucadendrum, with newcomers Leucadendrum cordifolium, Leucadendrum gracile, Leucadendrum parile, Leucadendrum royenaefolium, Leucadendrum saxatile and Leucadendrum truncatulum, all of which are now included in Leucospermum with the identical species name. It is assumed that Salisbury had based his review on a draft he had been studying of a paper called On the natural order of plants called Proteaceae that Robert Brown was to publish in 1810. Brown however, called the genus Leucospermum, distinguished eighteen species and made the new combinations Leucospermum lineare and L. spathulatum. Salisbury's names were ignored by botanists in favour of those that Brown had created, and this was formalised in 1900 when Leucospermum was given priority over Leucadendrum.

Johann Friedrich Klotzsch described L. pedunculatum in 1845. Carl Meissner, who contributed a section on the Proteaceae in 1856 to the series Prodromus Systematis Naturalis Regni Vegetabilis by Alphonse Pyramus de Candolle, recognised twenty-three species, including seven new ones: L. gueinzii, L. mundii, L. reflexum, L. oleaefolium var. brownii (now L. bolusii), L. zeyheri var. truncatum (now L. truncatum), L. attenuatum var. praemorsum and var. ambiguum (now L. praemorsum and L. erubescens). Otto Kuntze revised the genus in 1891 and called it Leucadendron, a homonym of a name that had already been used by Linnaeus in 1753 for another group of Proteaceae, which have separate sexes and very large bracts. Edwin Percy Phillips newly described L. glabrum and L. muirii in 1910, Spencer Le Marchant Moore portrayed L. saxosum in 1911, while Otto Stapf added L. gerrardii in 1912. In 1912, Phillips and Otto Stapf revised Leucospermum and recognised thirty-one species. Afterwards, Phillips described L. cordatum (1923) and L. patersonii (1928). Robert Harold Compton added L. wittebergense in 1931 and L. catherinae in 1933. This was followed by L. arenarium by Hedley Brian Rycroft in 1959. John Patrick Rourke in 1970 distinguished 47 species, eight of which new to science: L. erubescens, L. fulgens, L. innovans, L. pluridens, L. praecox, L. profugum, L. secundifolium and L. utriculosum. He later added the newly discovered L. winteri in 1978, L. hamatum in 1983, and L. harpagonatum in 1994. Rourke erected several sections in 1970, among which Xericola, to which he assigned L. alpinum including a subspecies amoenum, L. obtusum including a subspecies albomontanum, as well as L. secundiflorum. In 1984, he erected a new genus Vexatorella to which he moved these taxa, with the exception of L. secundiflorum, that he included in the section Diastelloidea.

The name of the genus Leucospermum is compounded from the Greek words λευκός (leukos) meaning white, and σπέρμα (sperma) meaning seed, so "white seed", which is a reference to the pale elaiosome surrounding the seeds. Species within the genus are commonly known as pincushions.

=== Phylogeny ===
Comparison of homologous DNA has increased the insight in the phylogenetic relationships between the Proteaceae. Leucospermum belongs to a group that further only consists of genera endemic to the Cape Floristic Region, that together constitute the subtribe Leucadendrinae. Leucospermum is most related to Mimetes, which however is only monophyletic if both Diastella and Orothamnus would be included in it. A subgroup of Paranomus, Vexatorella, Sorocephalus and Spatalla is the sister group to the Leucospermum-Mimetes subgroup. The following tree represents those insights.

- subtribe Leucadendrinae
  - Leucadendron
  - - - - Leucospermum
        - Mimetes, Diastella and Orothamnus
      - - - Vexatorella
          - Paranomus
        - - Sorocephalus
          - Spatalla
    - Serruria

=== Subdivision ===
The genus Leucospermum is divided into nine groups called sections. These are Brevifilamentum, Cardinistyle, Conocarpodendron, Crassicaudex, Crinitae (synonym Diastella Meisn. non (Salisb.) Endl.), Diastelloidea, Hamatum, Leucospermum (synonym Hypophylloidea) and Timiditubus.

The following taxa are assigned to the respective sections.

- Brevifilamentum: L. vestitum (type), L. cordatum, L. cordifolium, L. lineare, L. patersonii, L. tottum
- Cardinistyle: L. formosum (type), L. catherinae, L. grandiflorum, L. gueinzii, L. praemorsum, L. reflexum
- Conocarpodendron: L. conocarpodendron (type), L. glabrum, L. pluridens
- Crassicaudex: L. cuneiforme (type), L. gerrardii, L. innovans, L. saxosum
- Crinitae: L. oleifolium (type), L. gracile, L. mundii, L. saxatile
- Diastelloidea: L. calligerum (type), L. bolusii, L. heterophyllum, L. pedunculatum, L. prostratum, L. royenifolium, L. secundifolium, L. truncatulum, L. winteri, L. wittebergense
- Hamatum: L. hamatum (type), L. harpagonatum
- Leucospermum: L. hypophyllocarpodendron (type), L. arenarium, L. parile, L. rodolentum, L. tomentosum
- Tumiditubus: L. praecox (type), L. erubescens, L. fulgens, L. muirii, L. profugum, L. spathulatum, L. truncatum, L. utriculosum
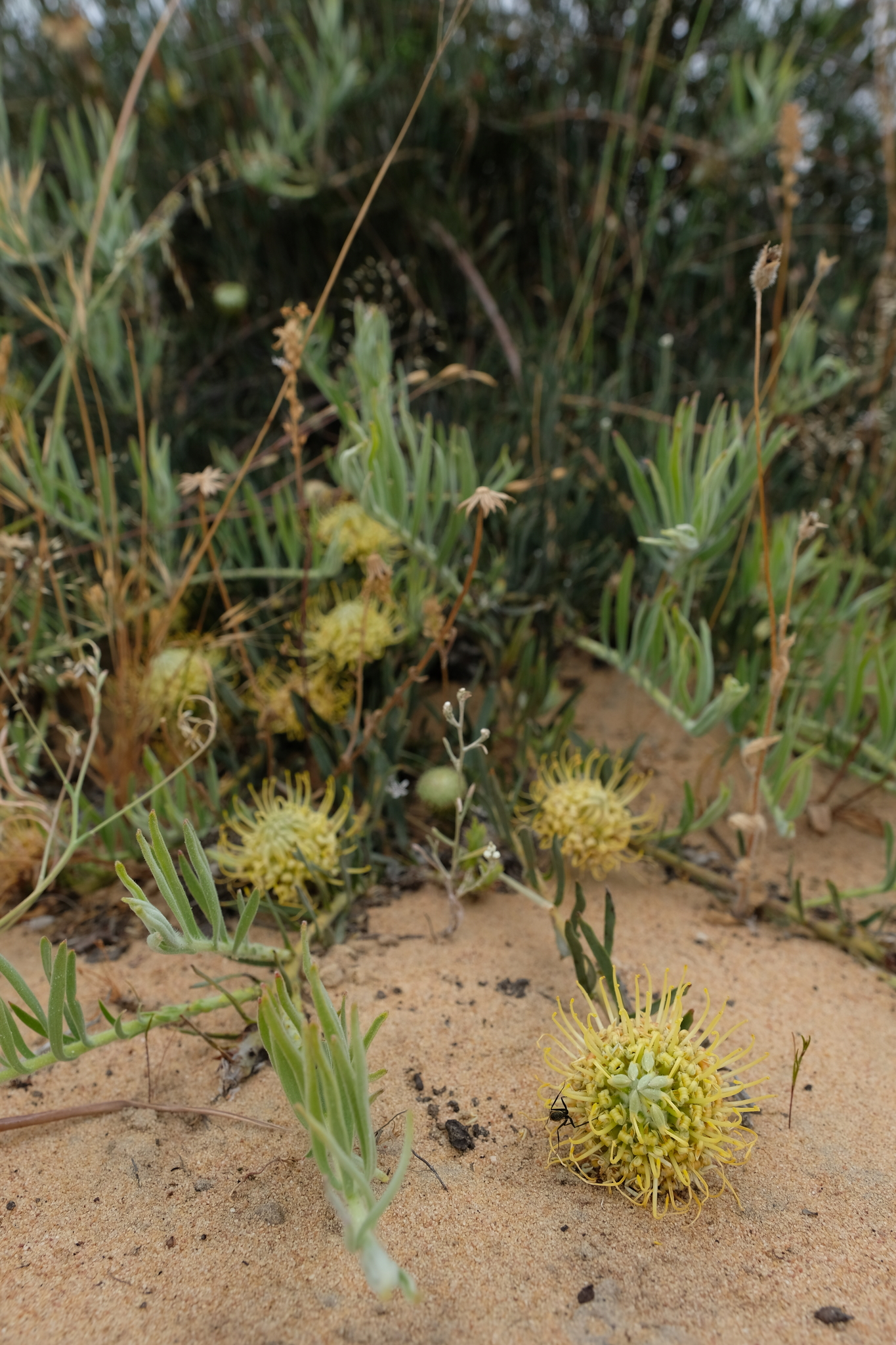
L. arenarium

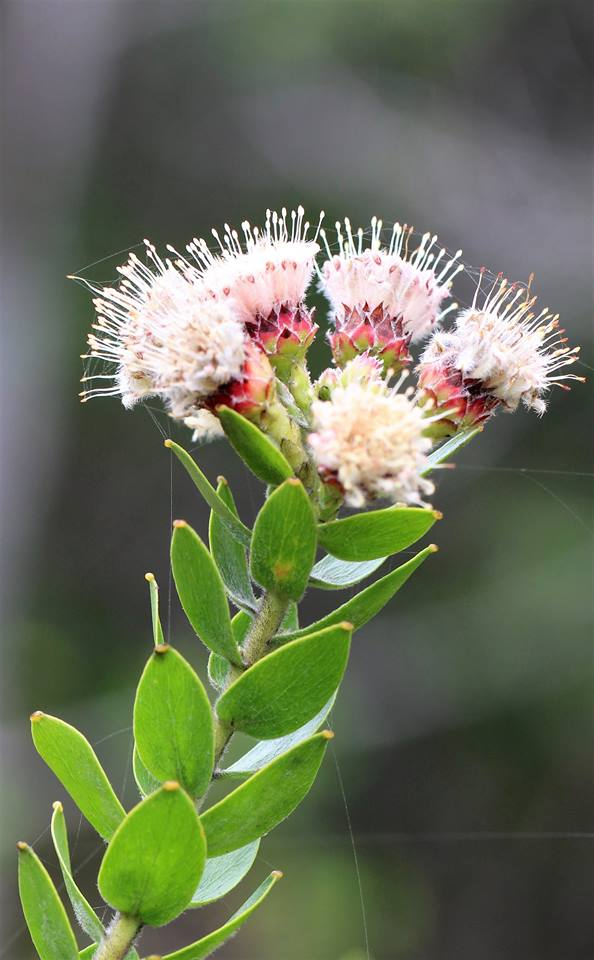
L. bolusii

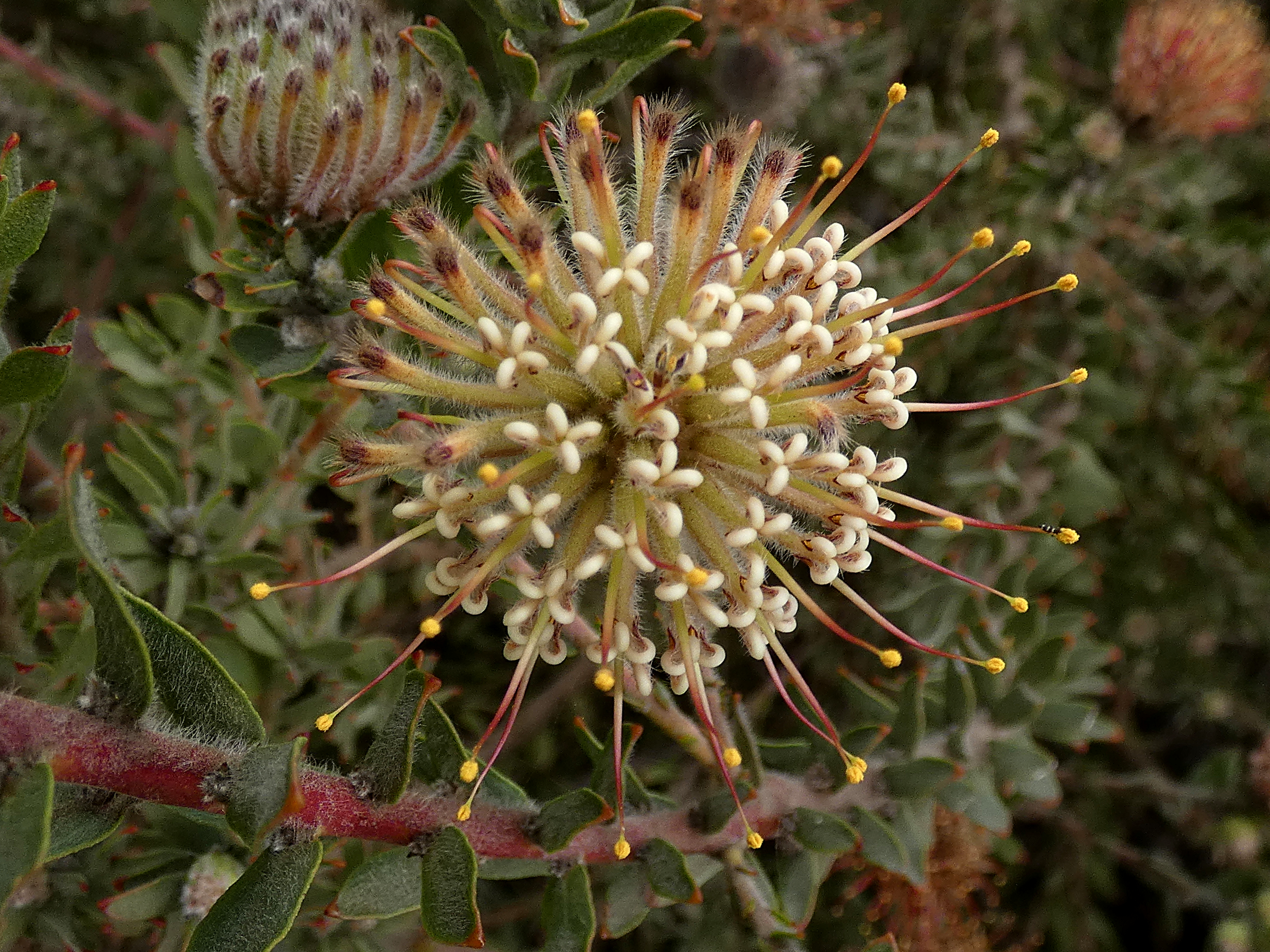
L. calligerum

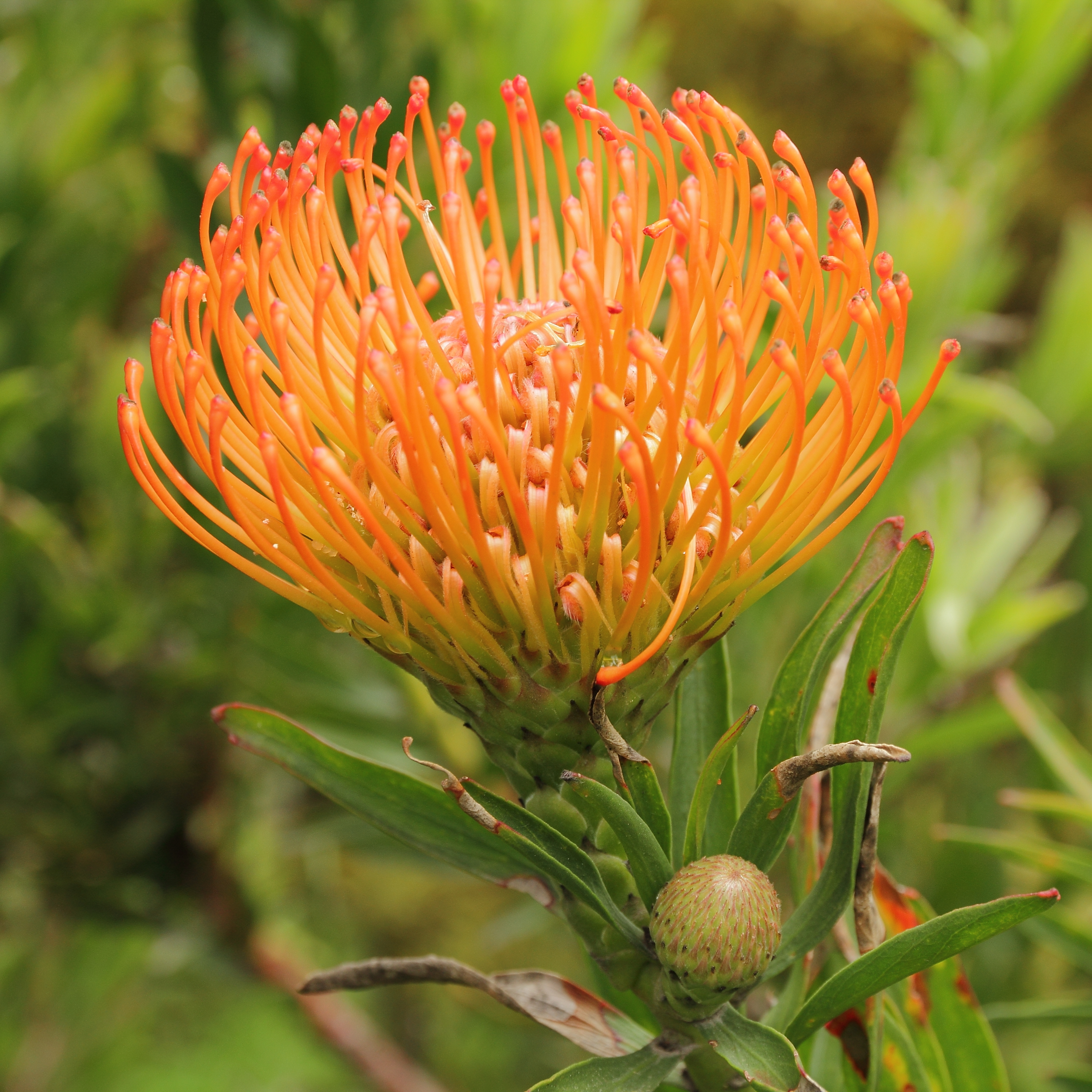
L. catherinae

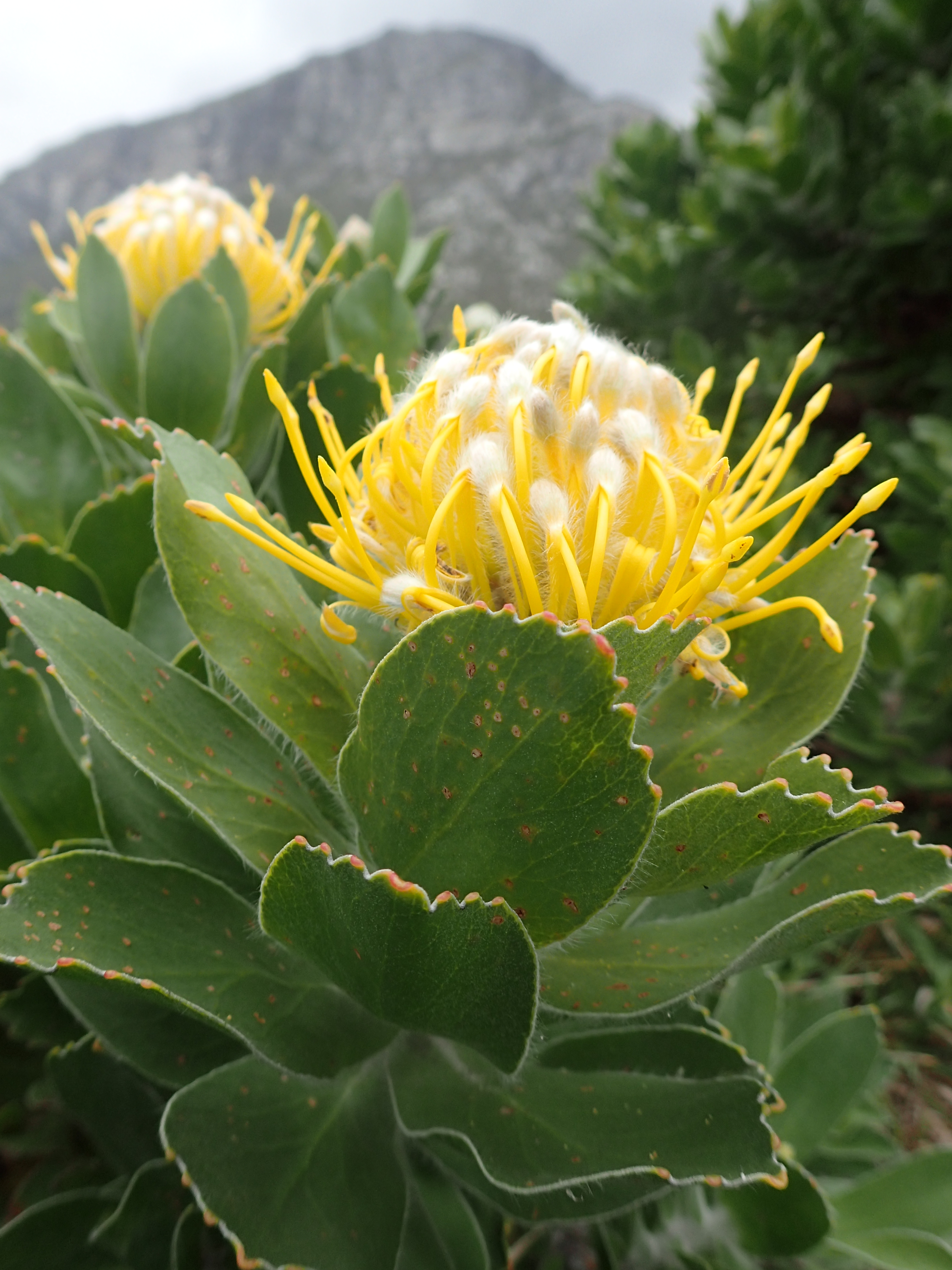
L. conocar-podendron

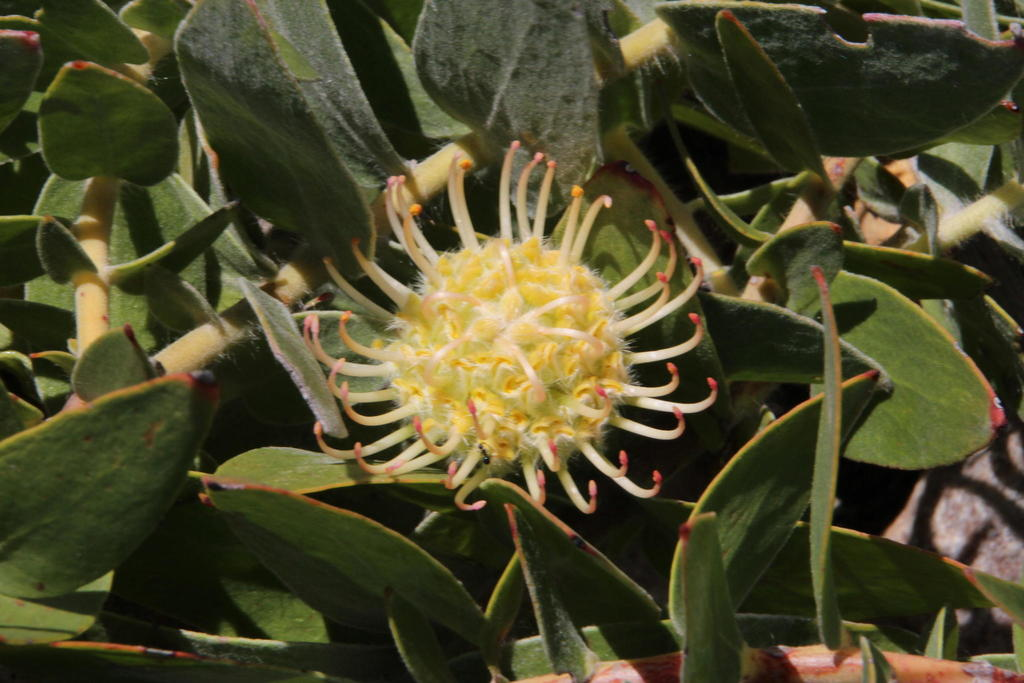
L. cordatum

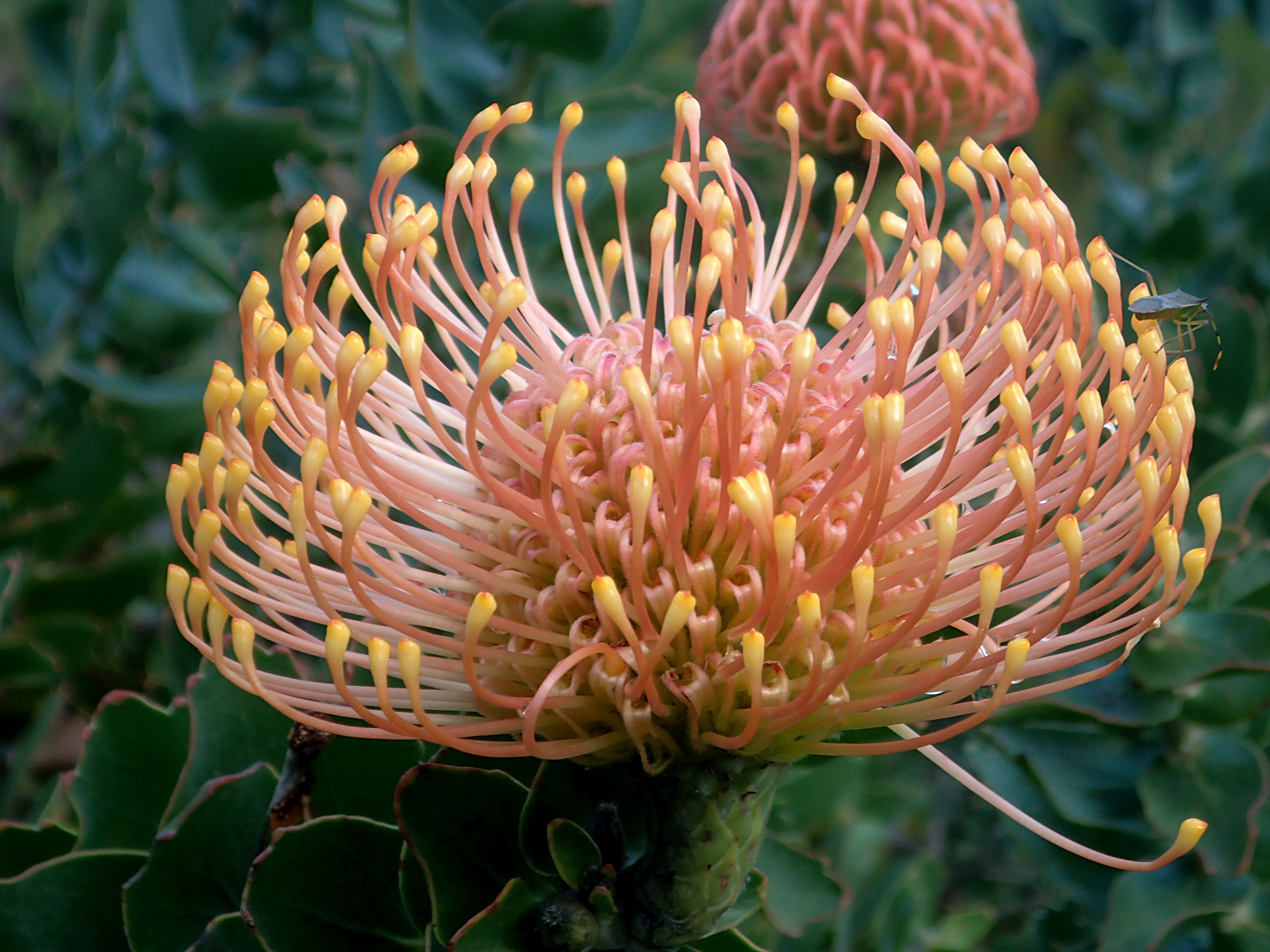
L. cordifolium

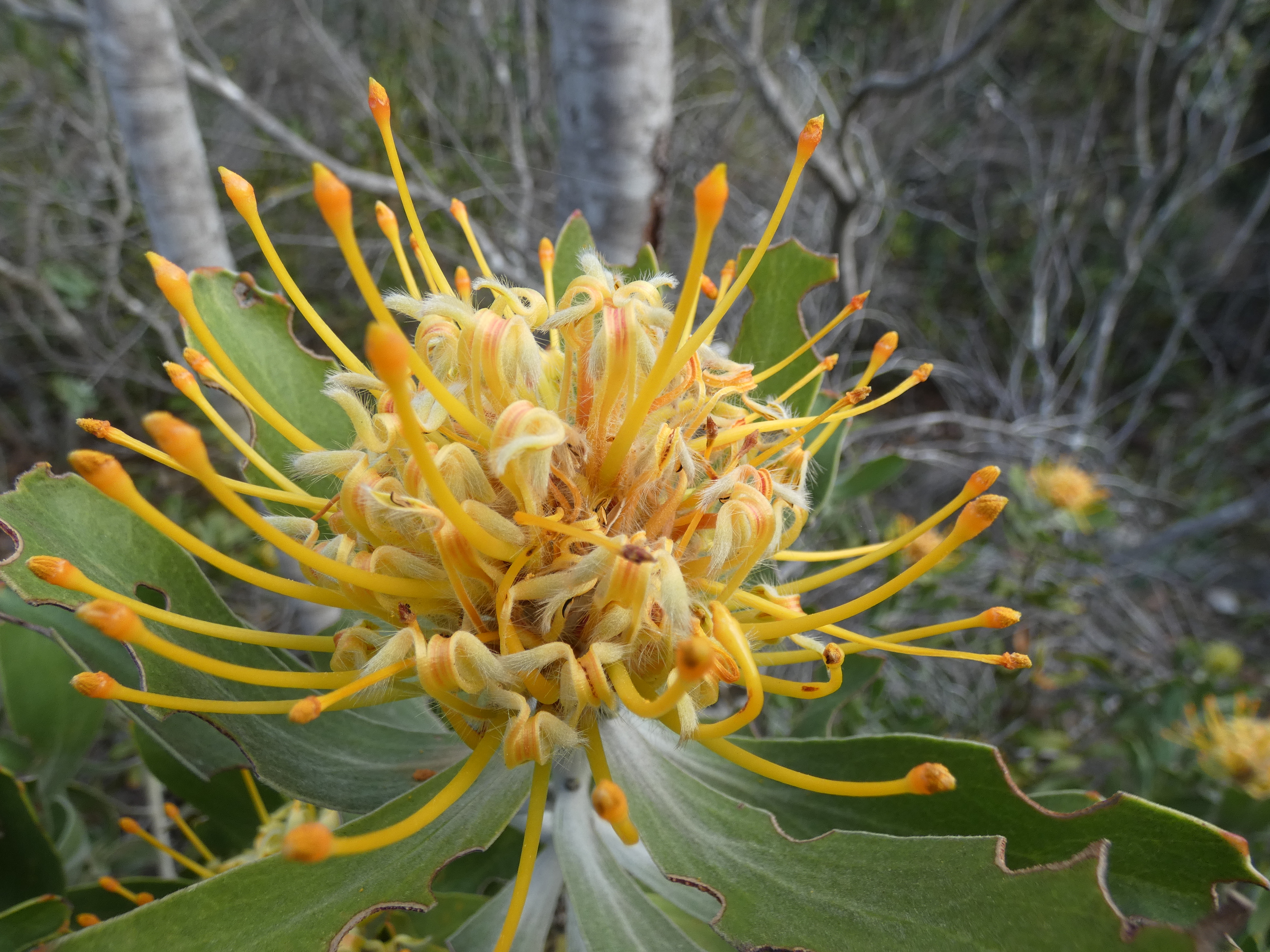
L. cuneiforme

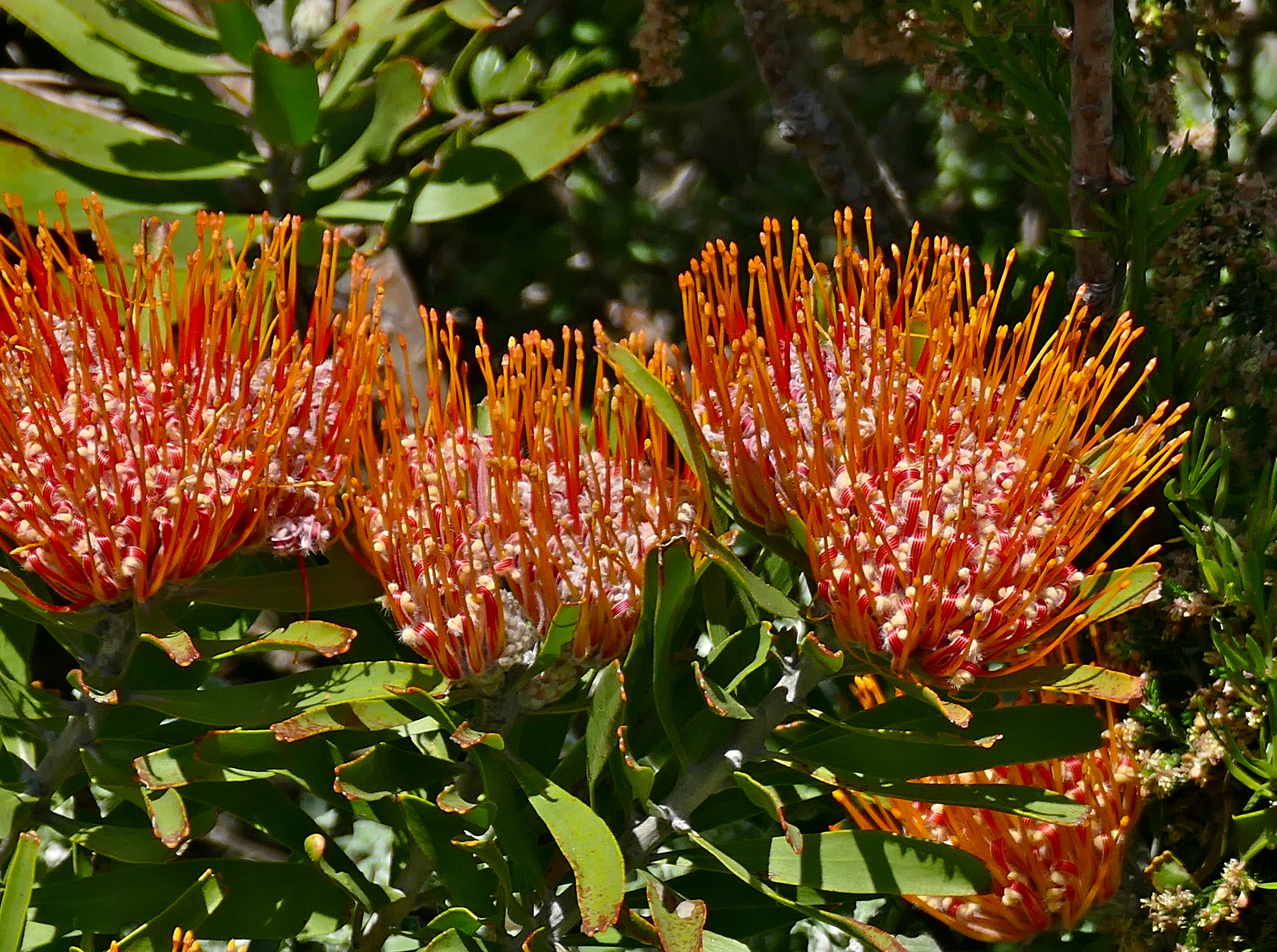
L. erubescens

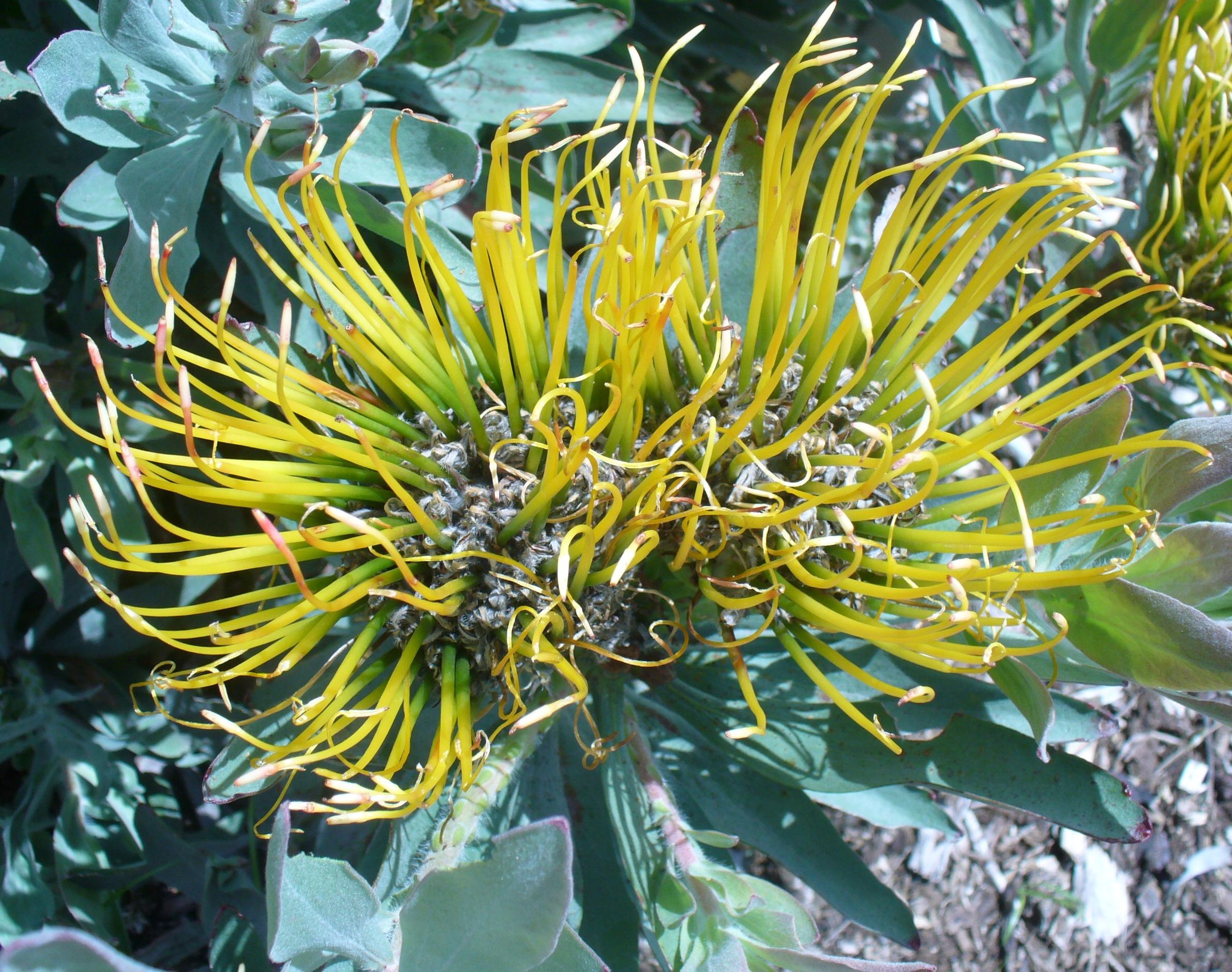
L. formosum

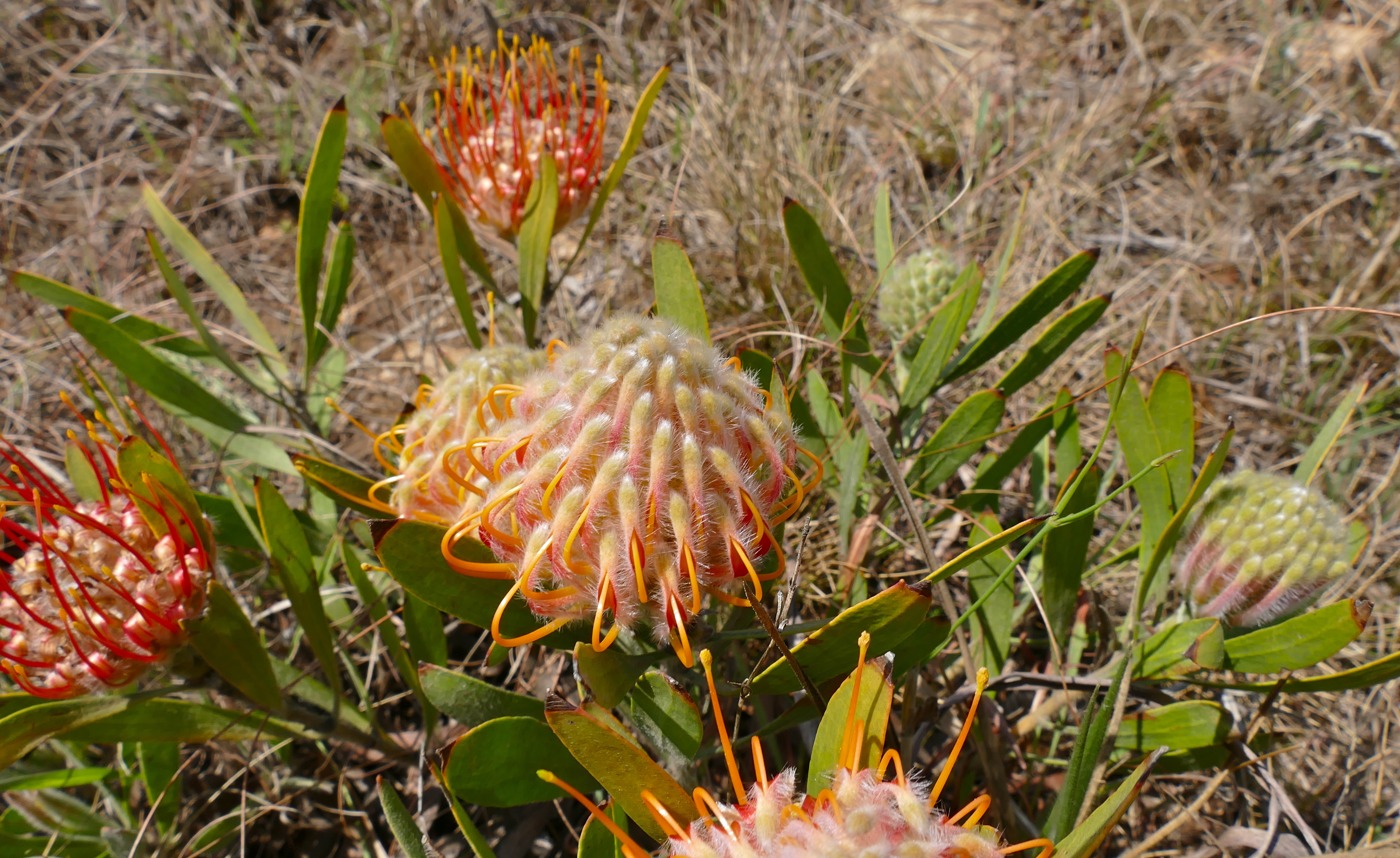
L. gerrardii

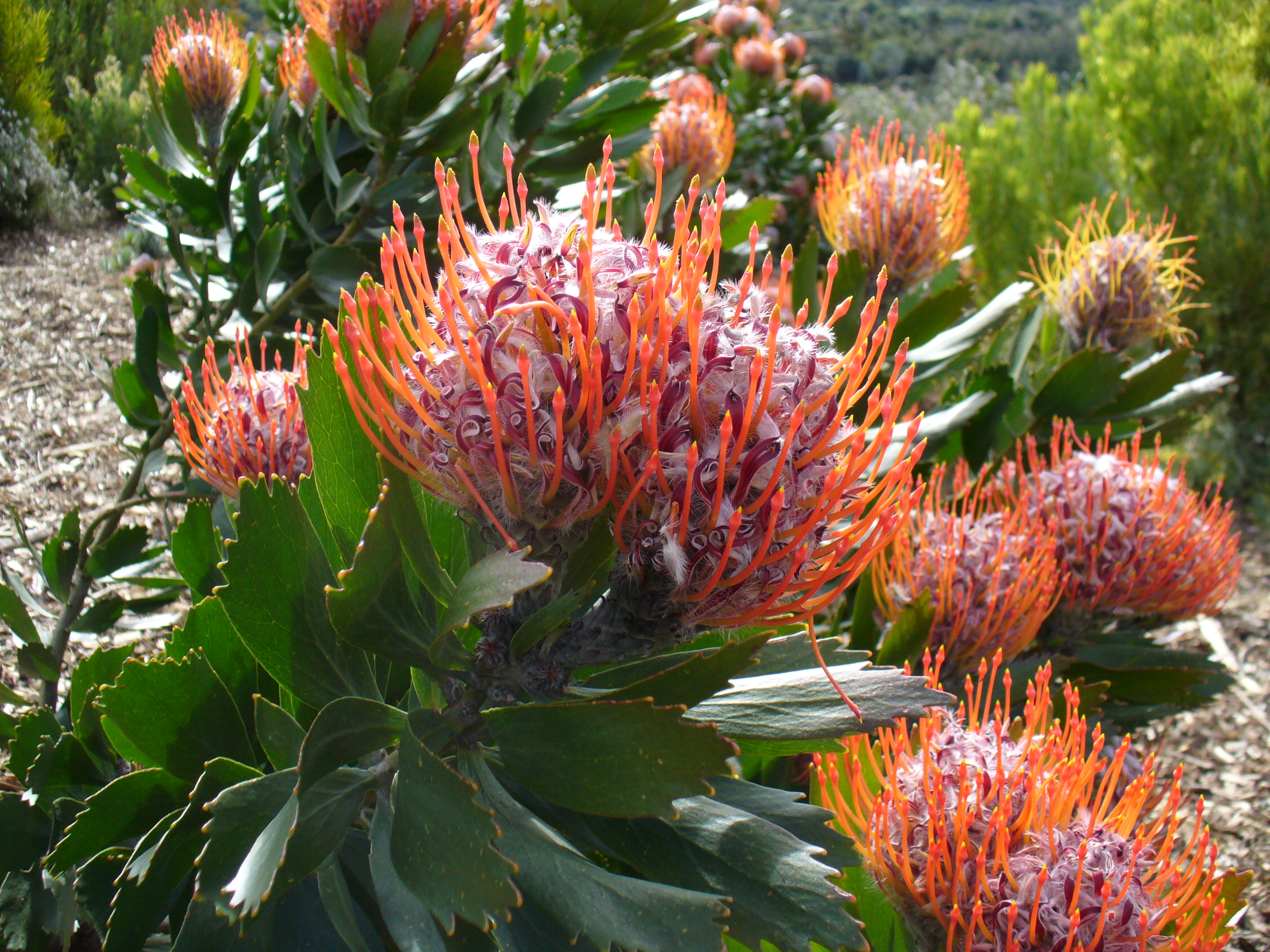
L. glabrum

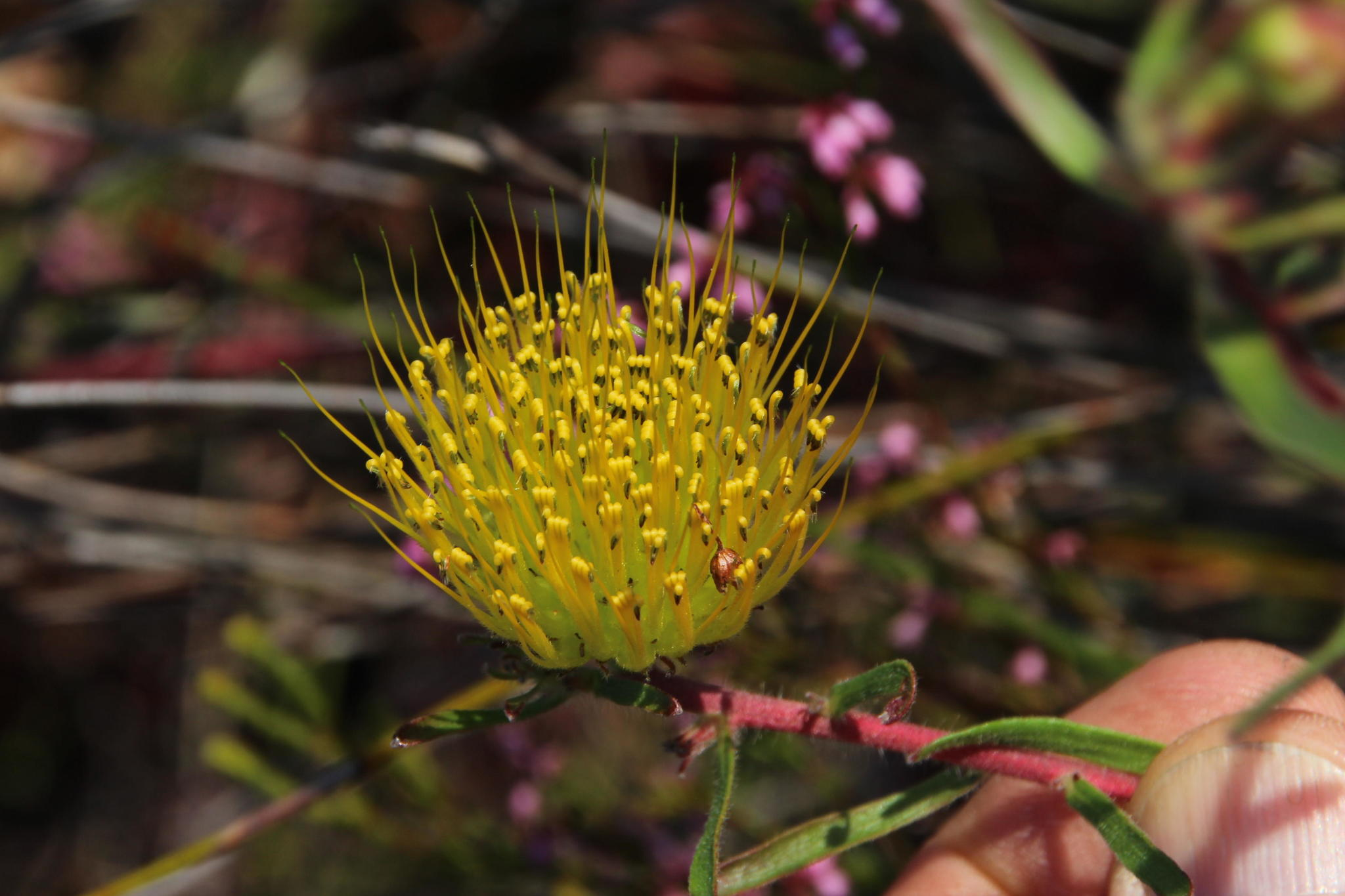
L. gracile

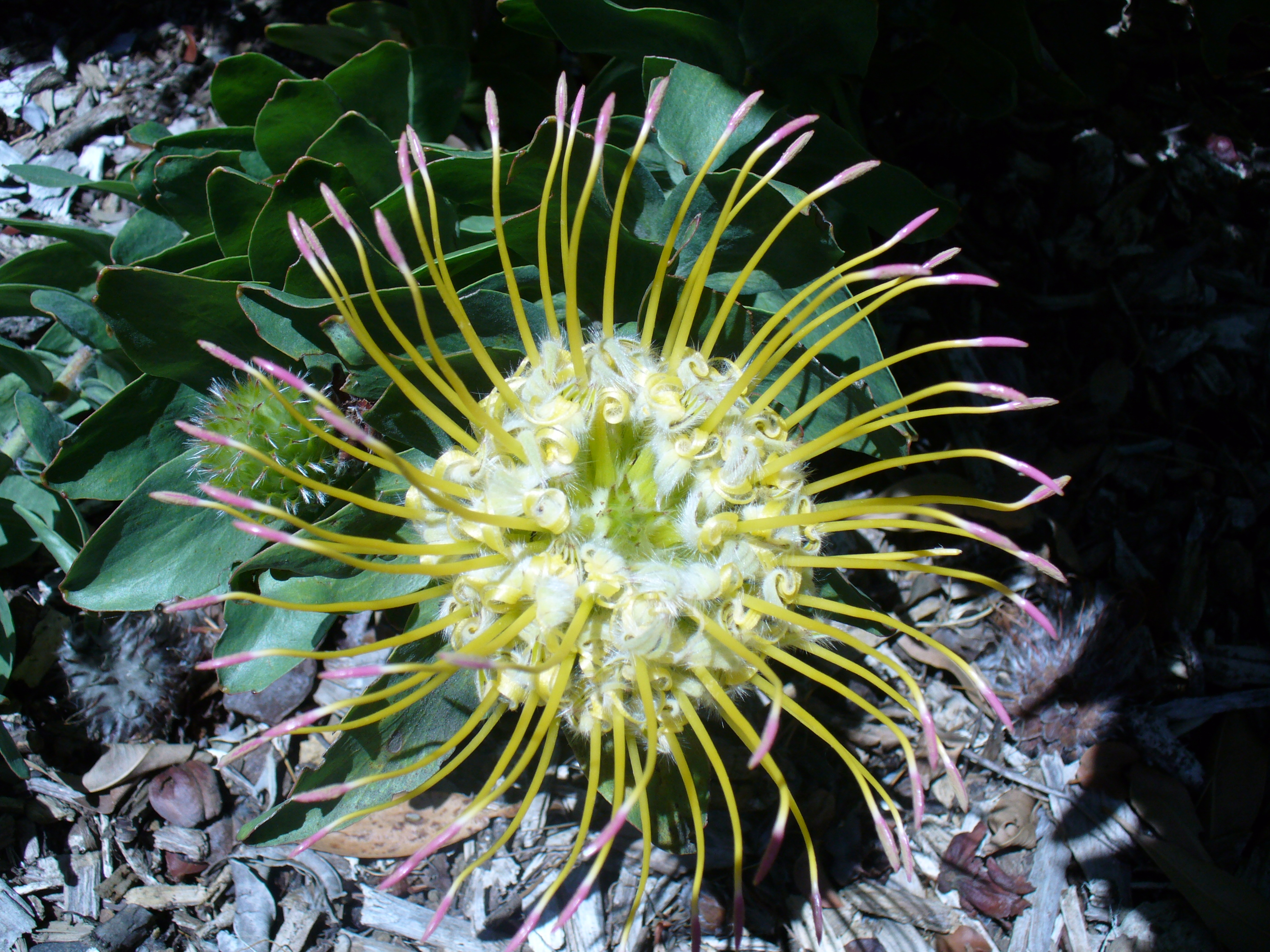
L. grandiflorum

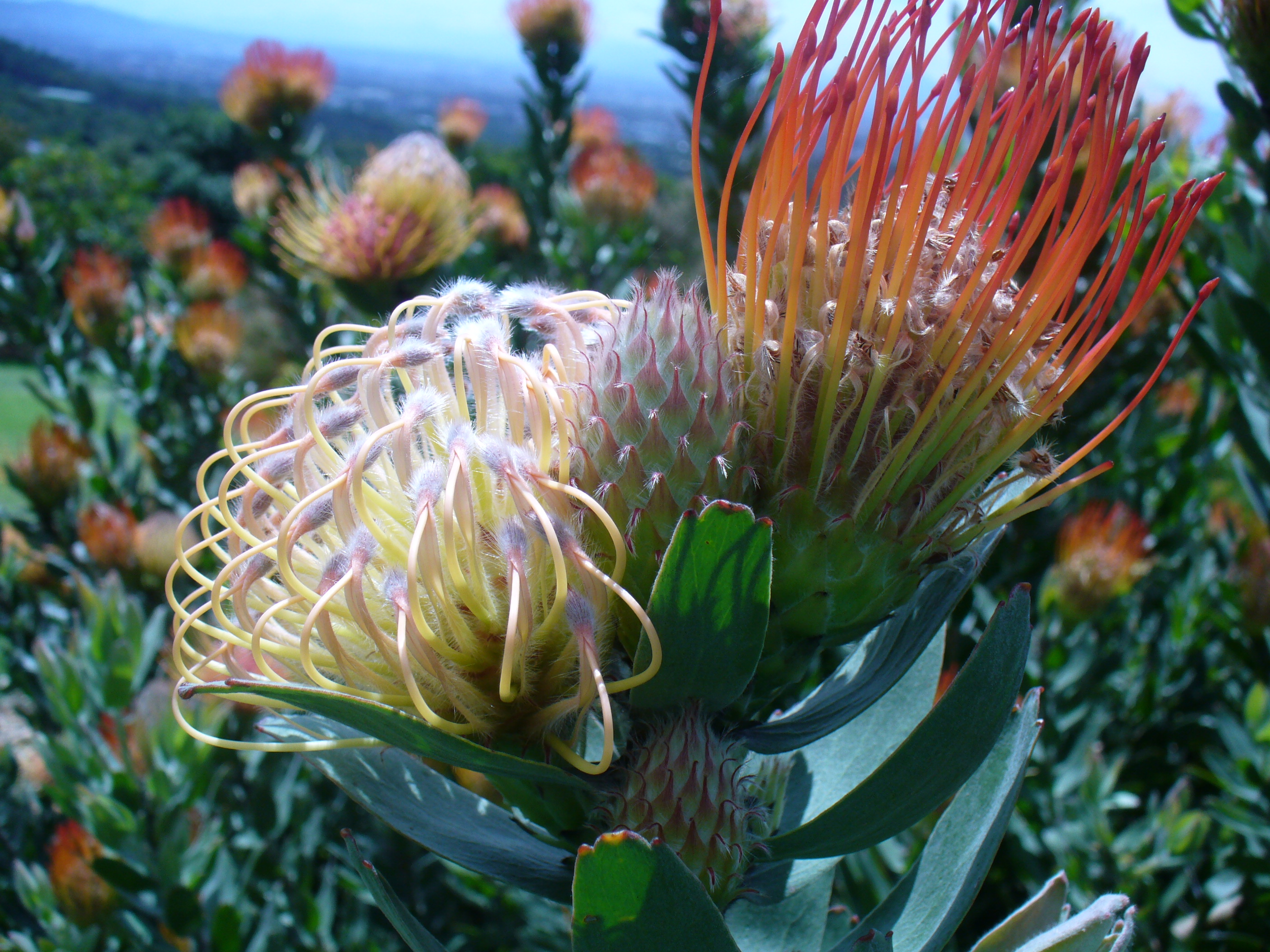
L. gueinzii

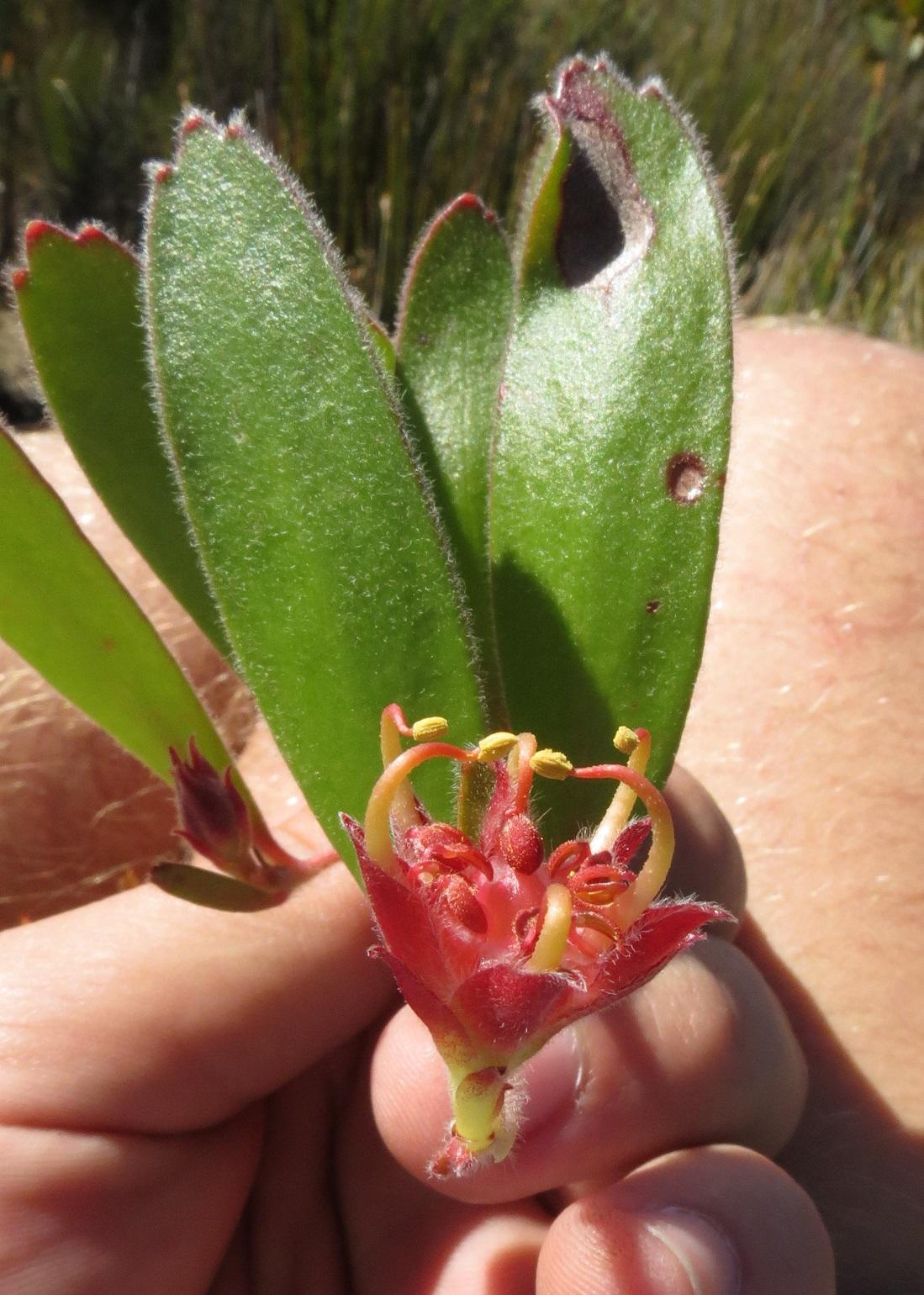
L. hamatum

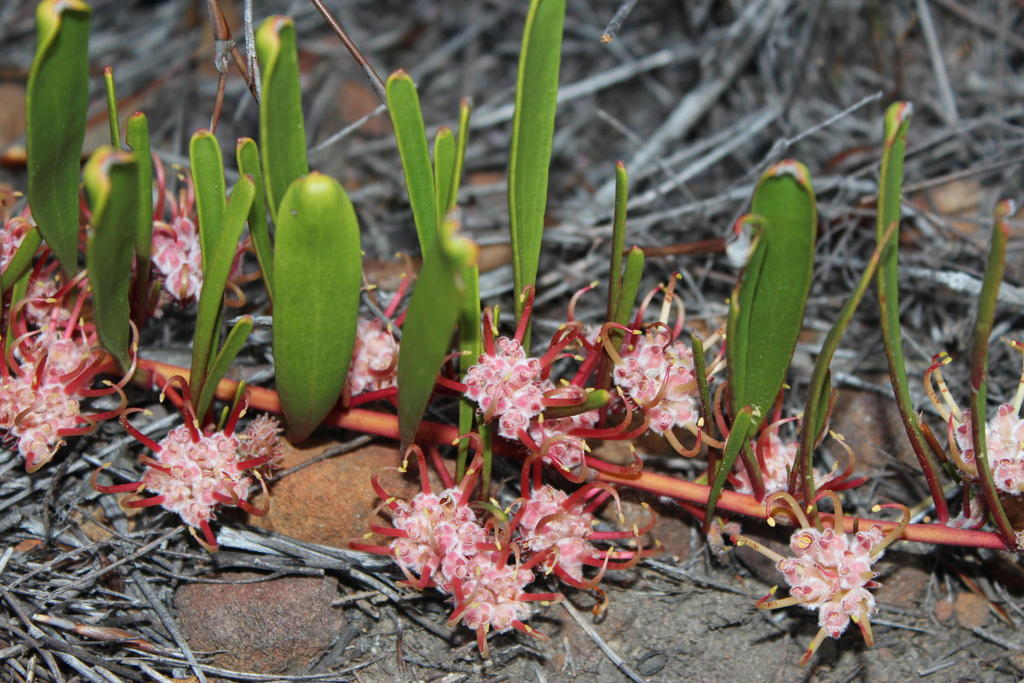
L. harpagonatum

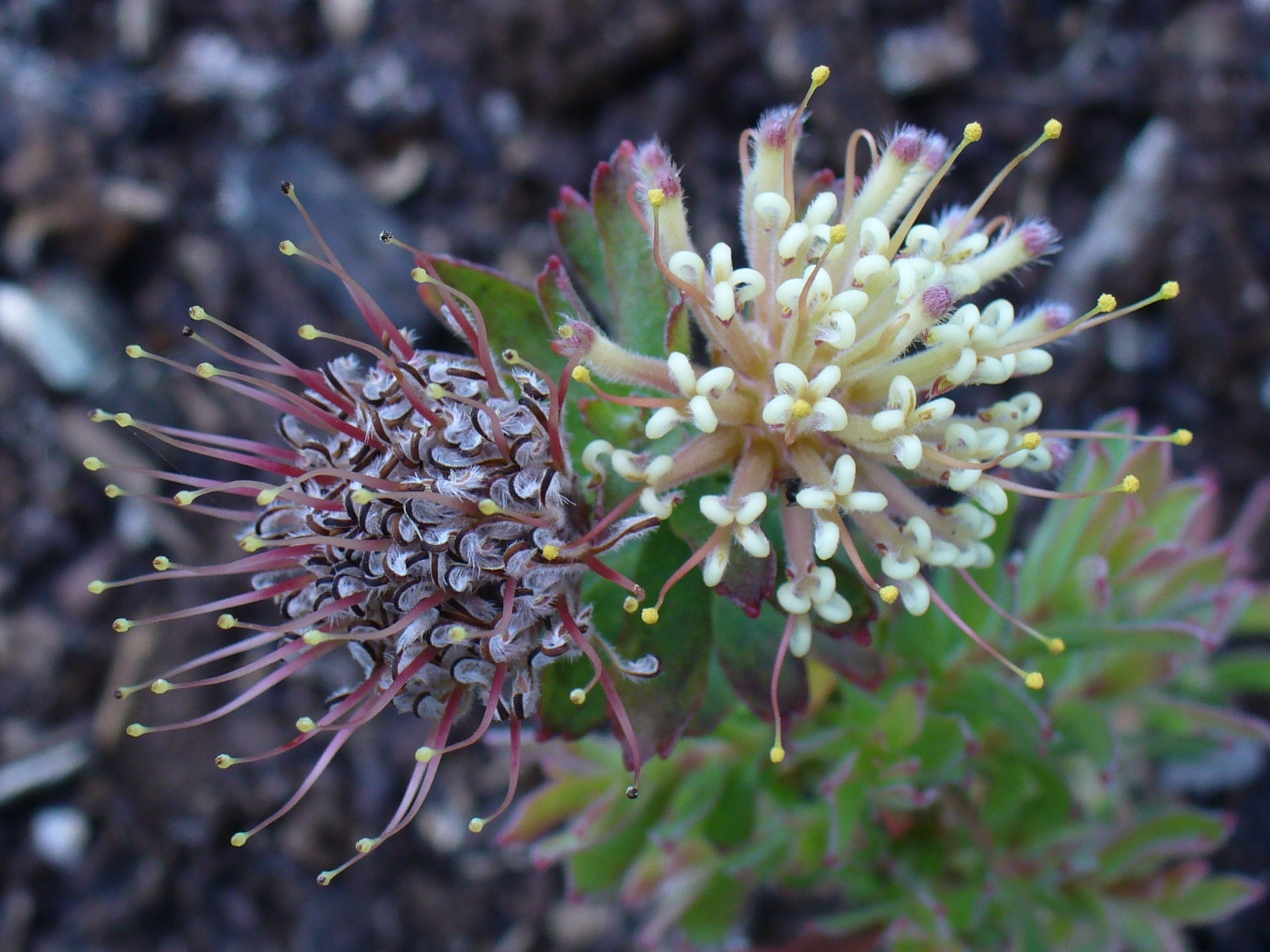
L. heterophyllum

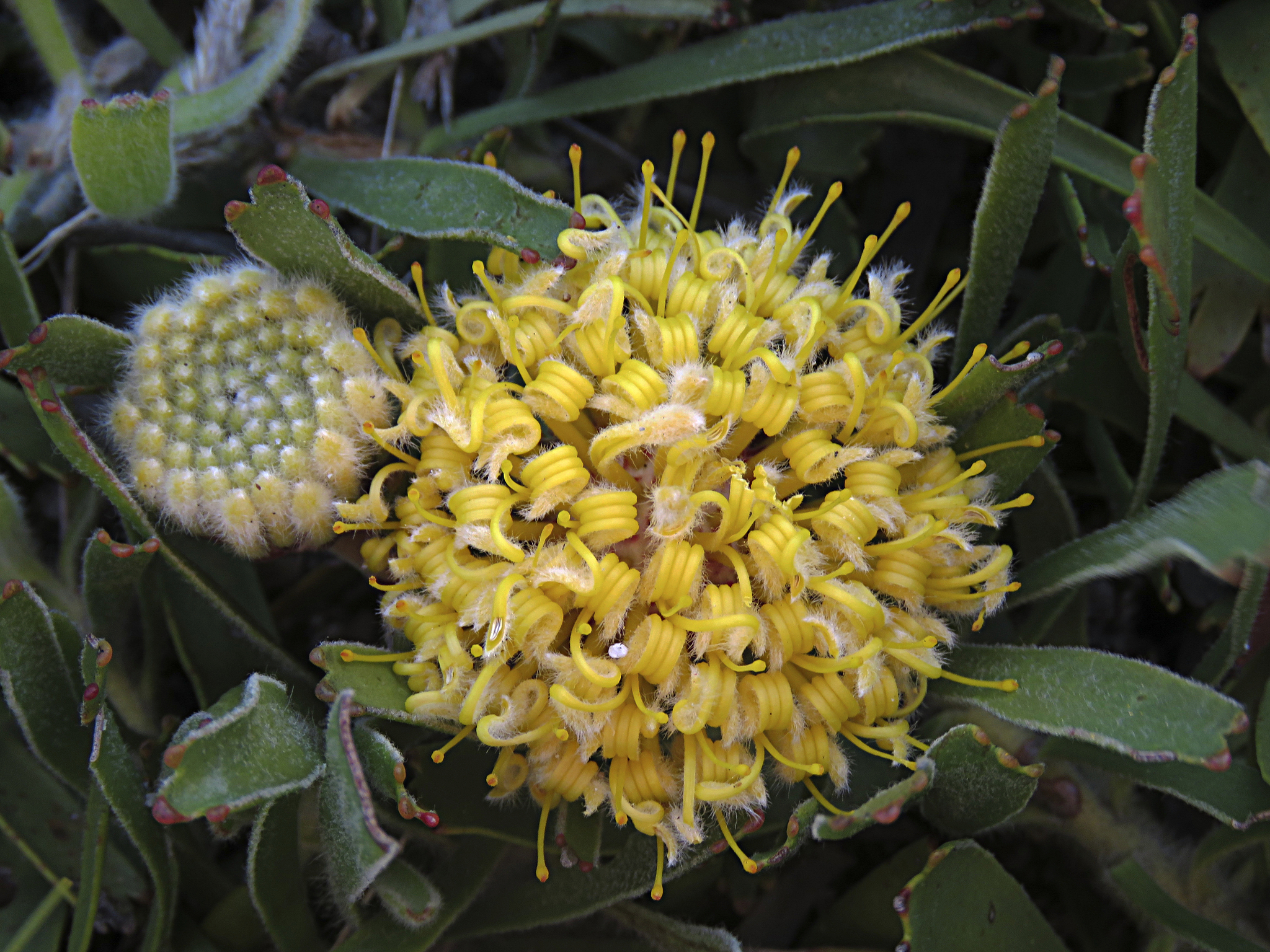
L. hypophyllocarpodendron subsp. hypophyllocarpodendron

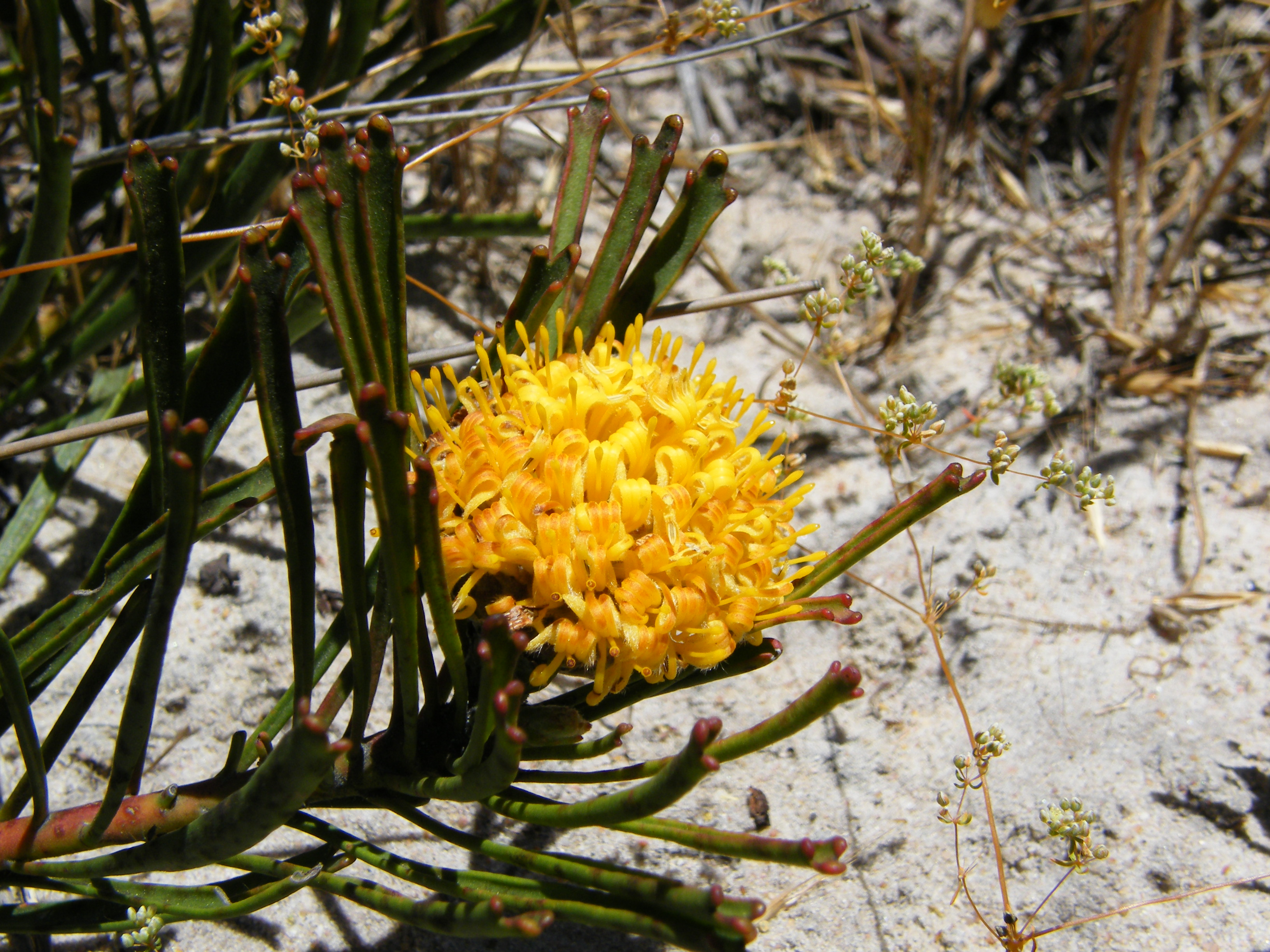
L. hypophyllocarpodendron subsp. canaliculatum

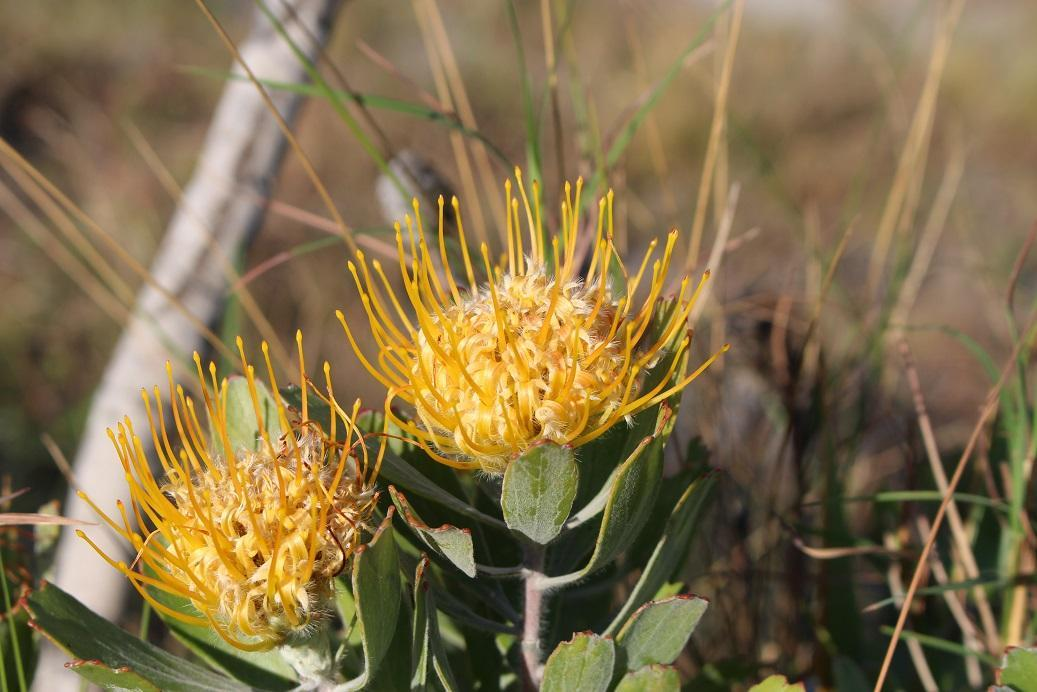
L. innovans

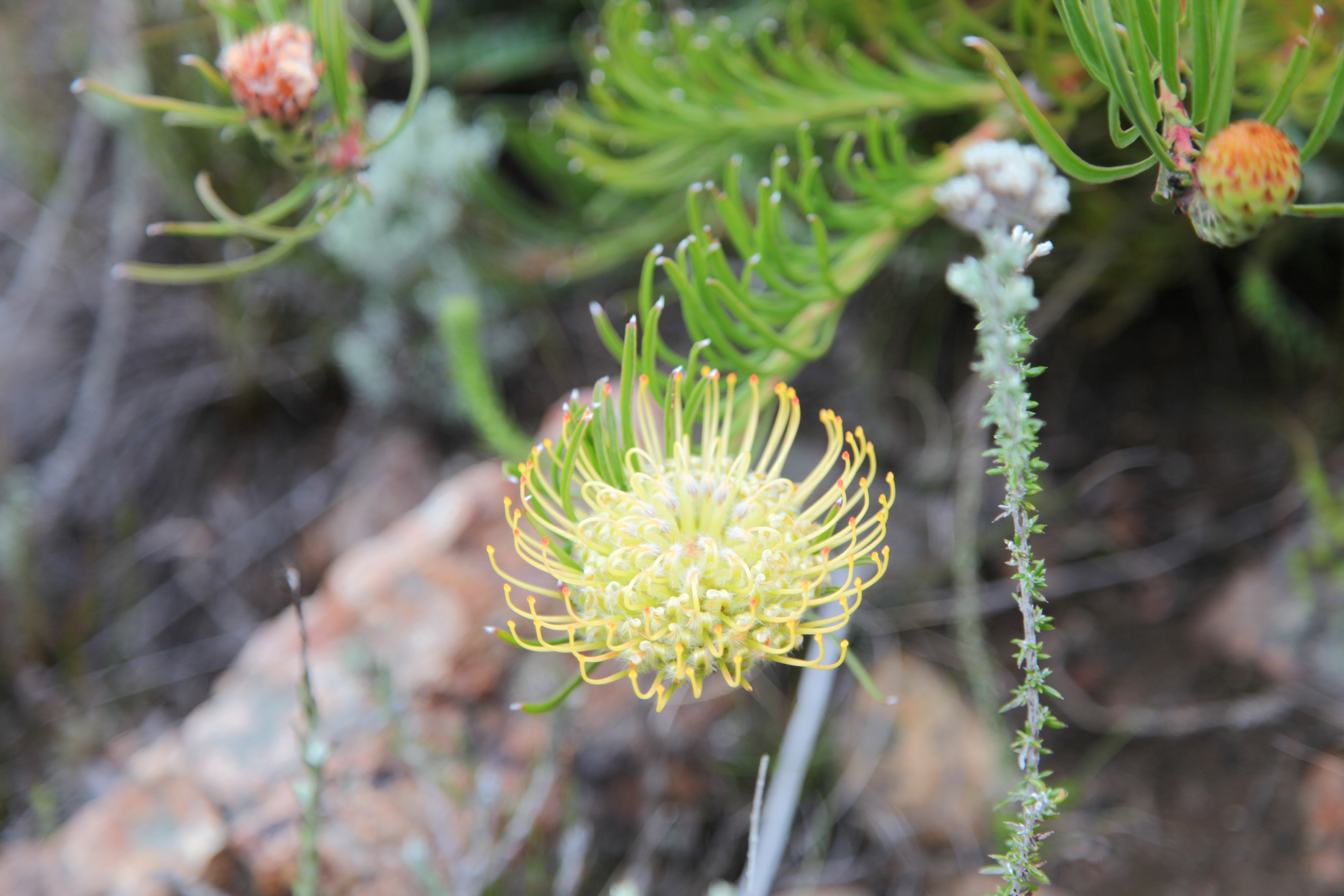
L. lineare

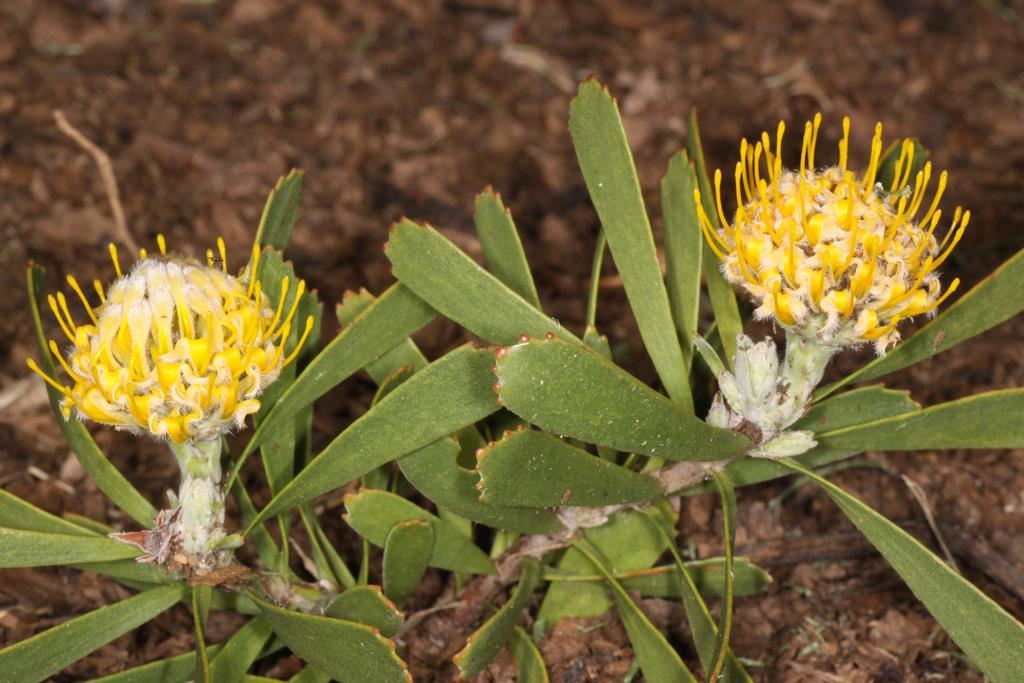
L. muirii

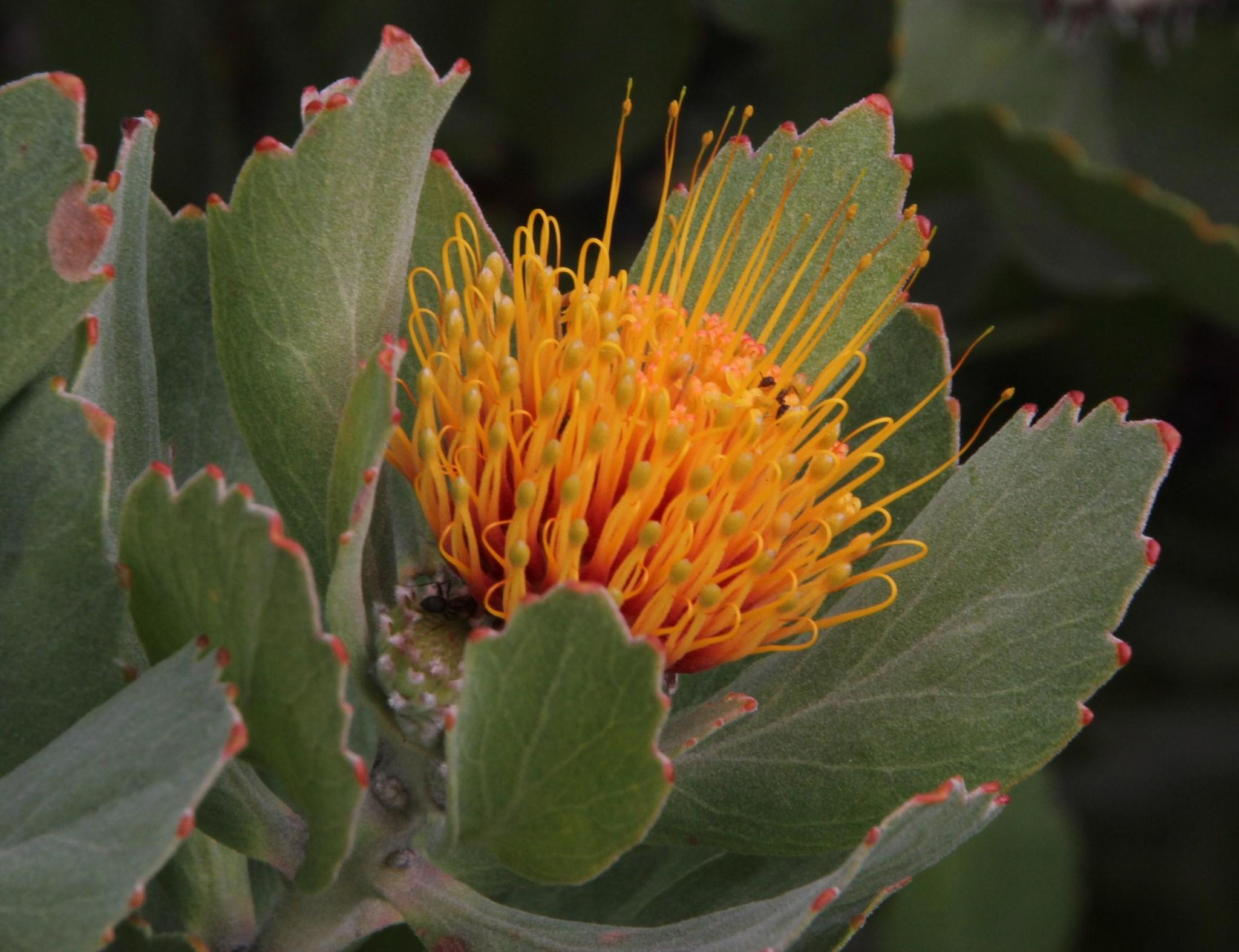
L. mundii

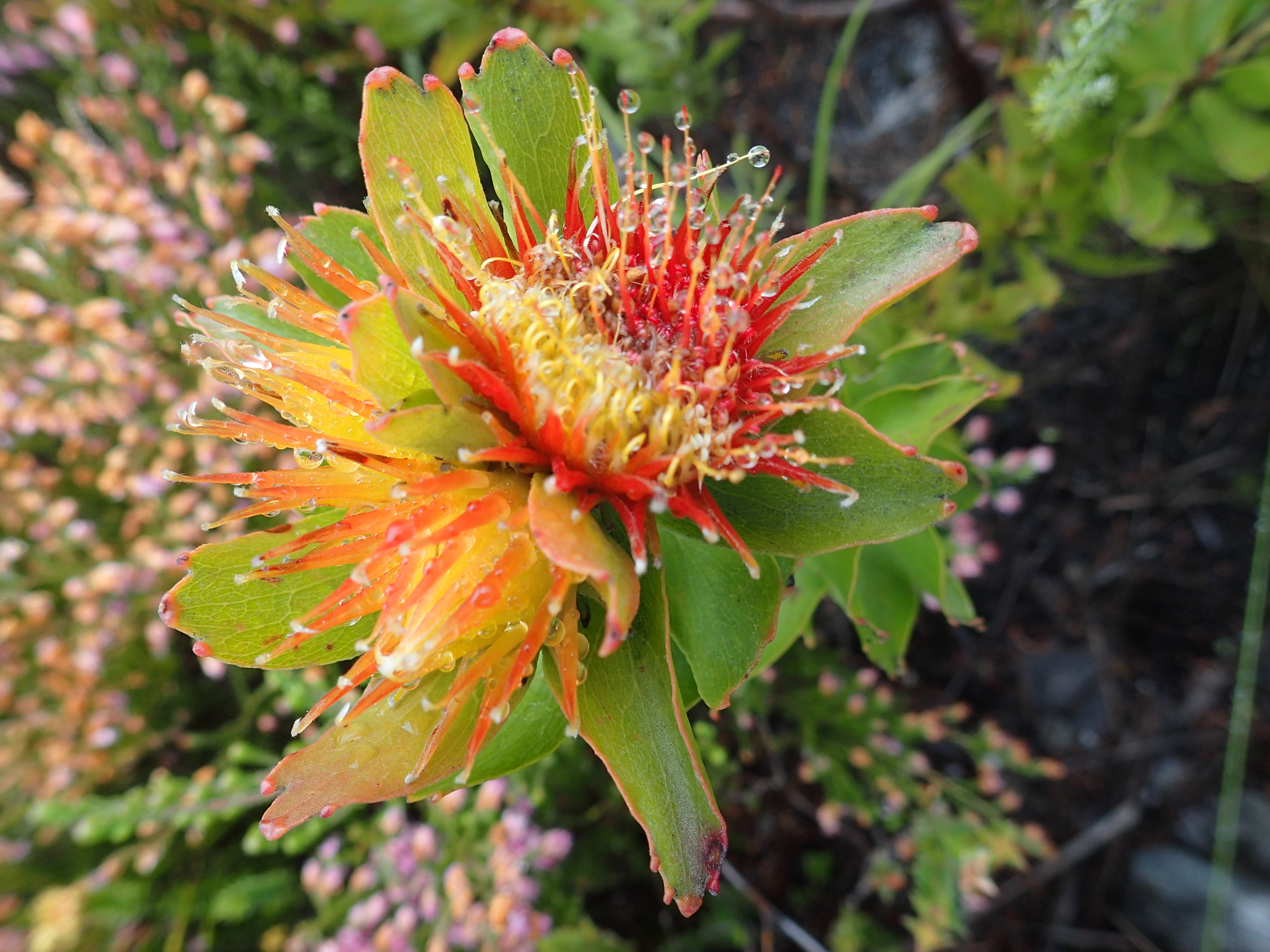
L. oleifolium

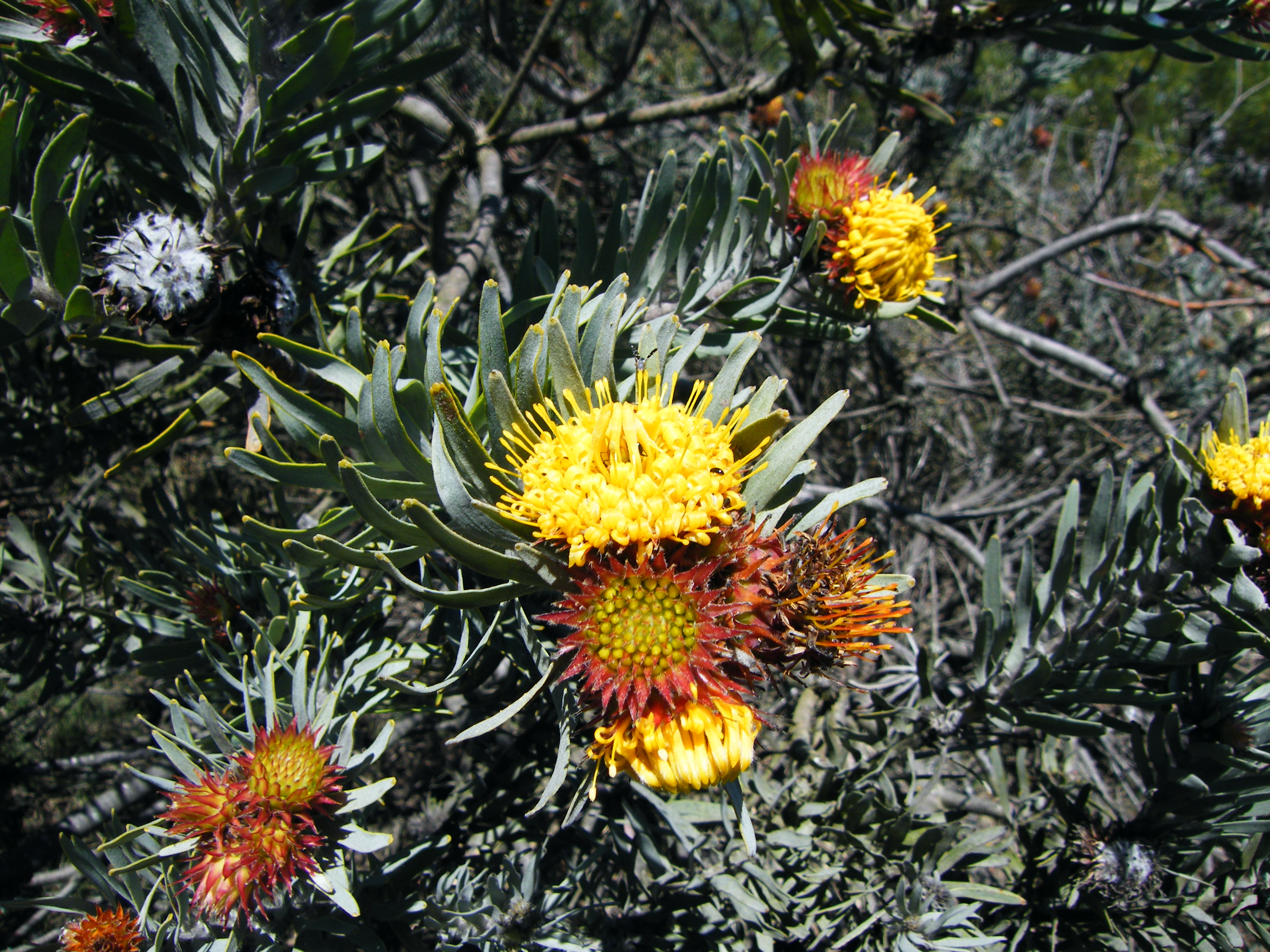
L. parile

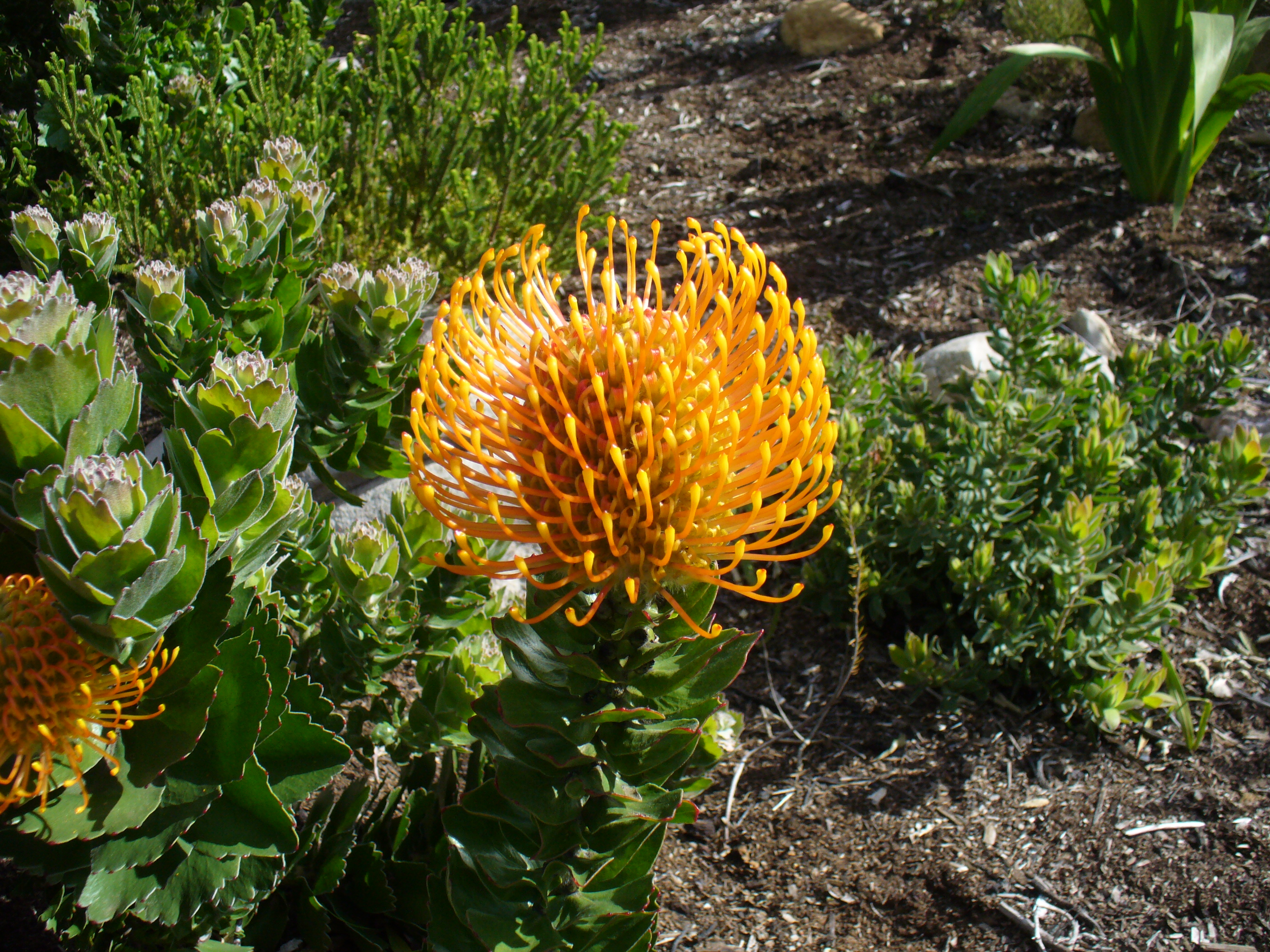
L. patersonii

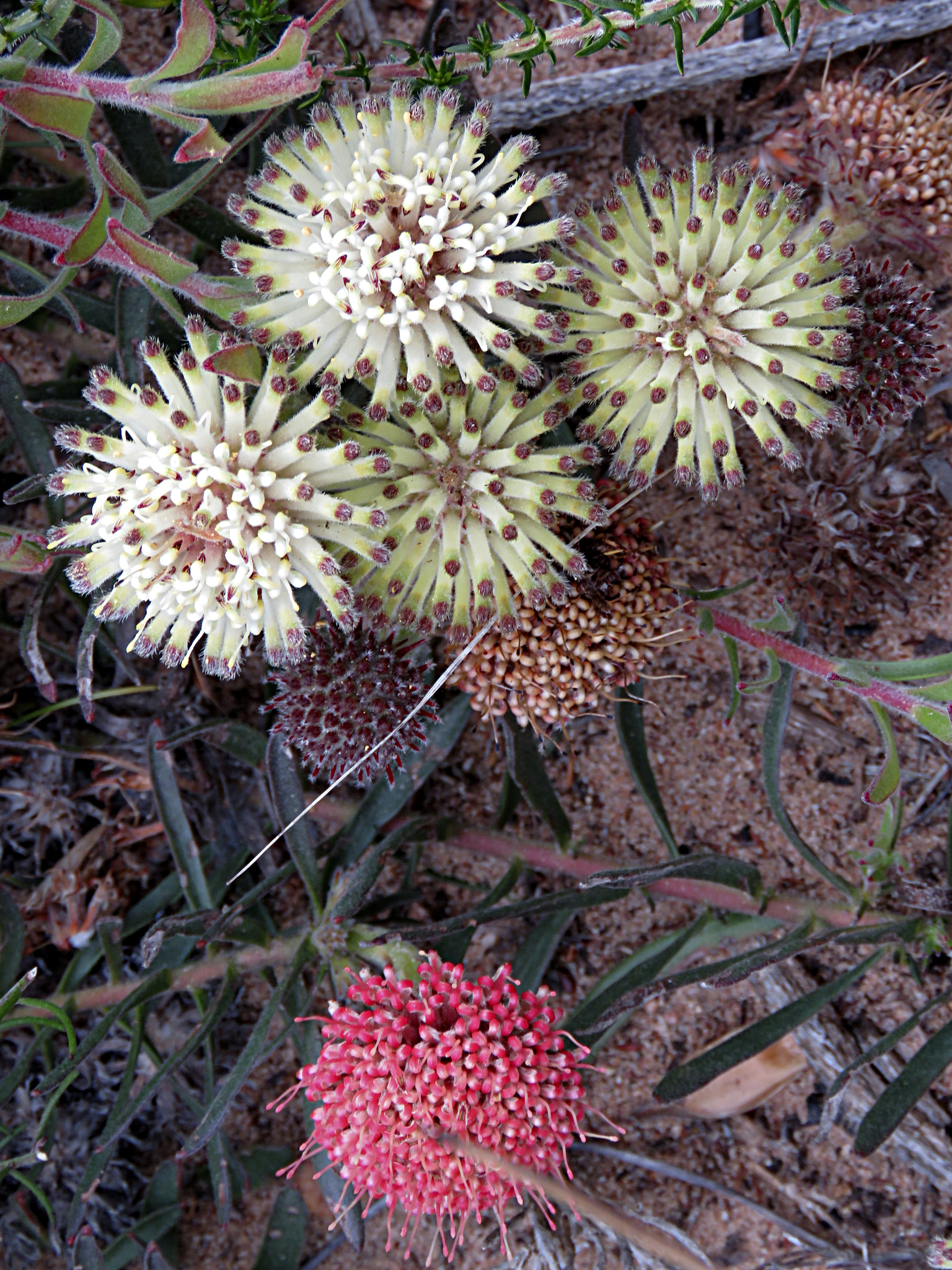
L. pedunculatum

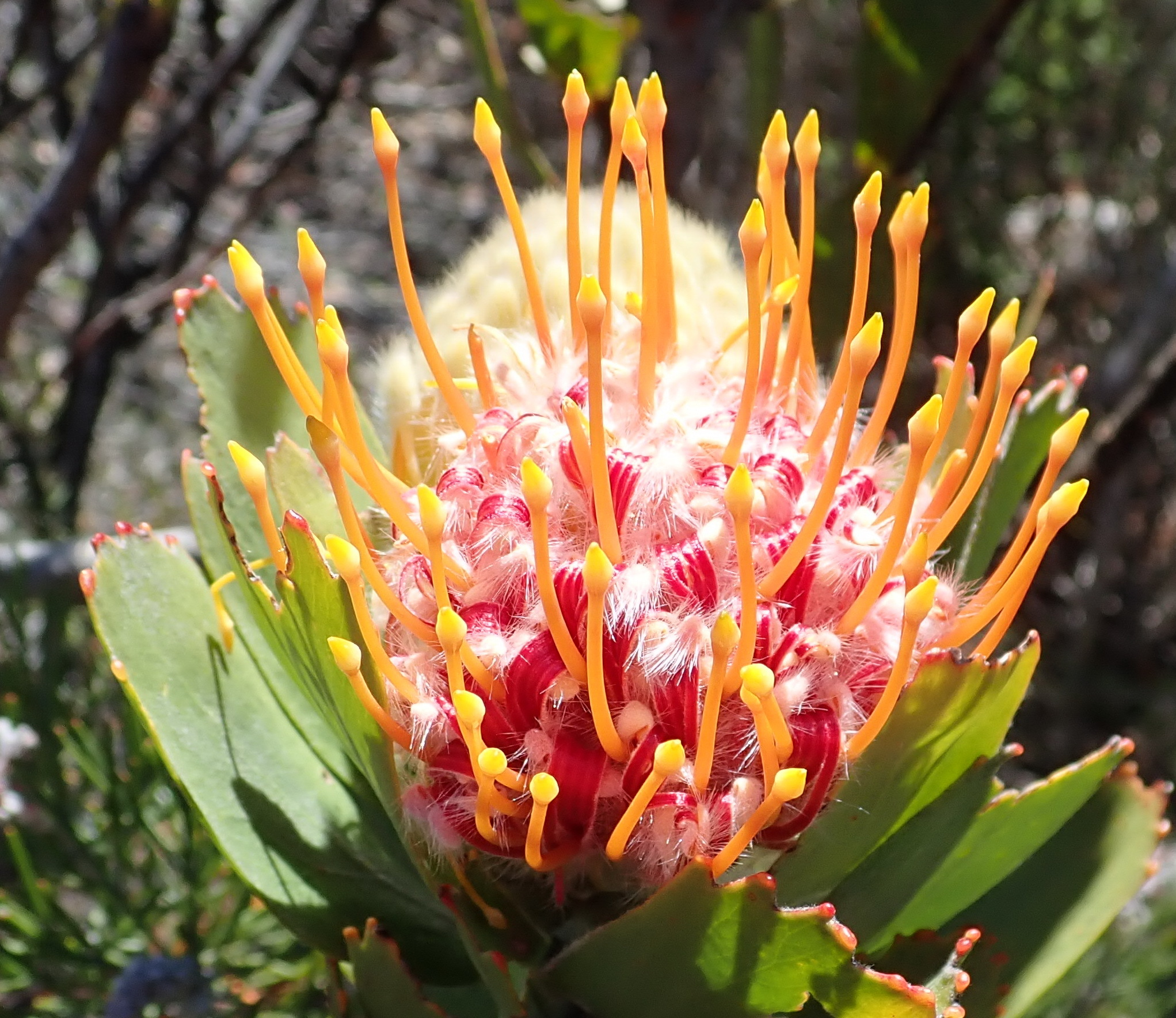
L. pluridens

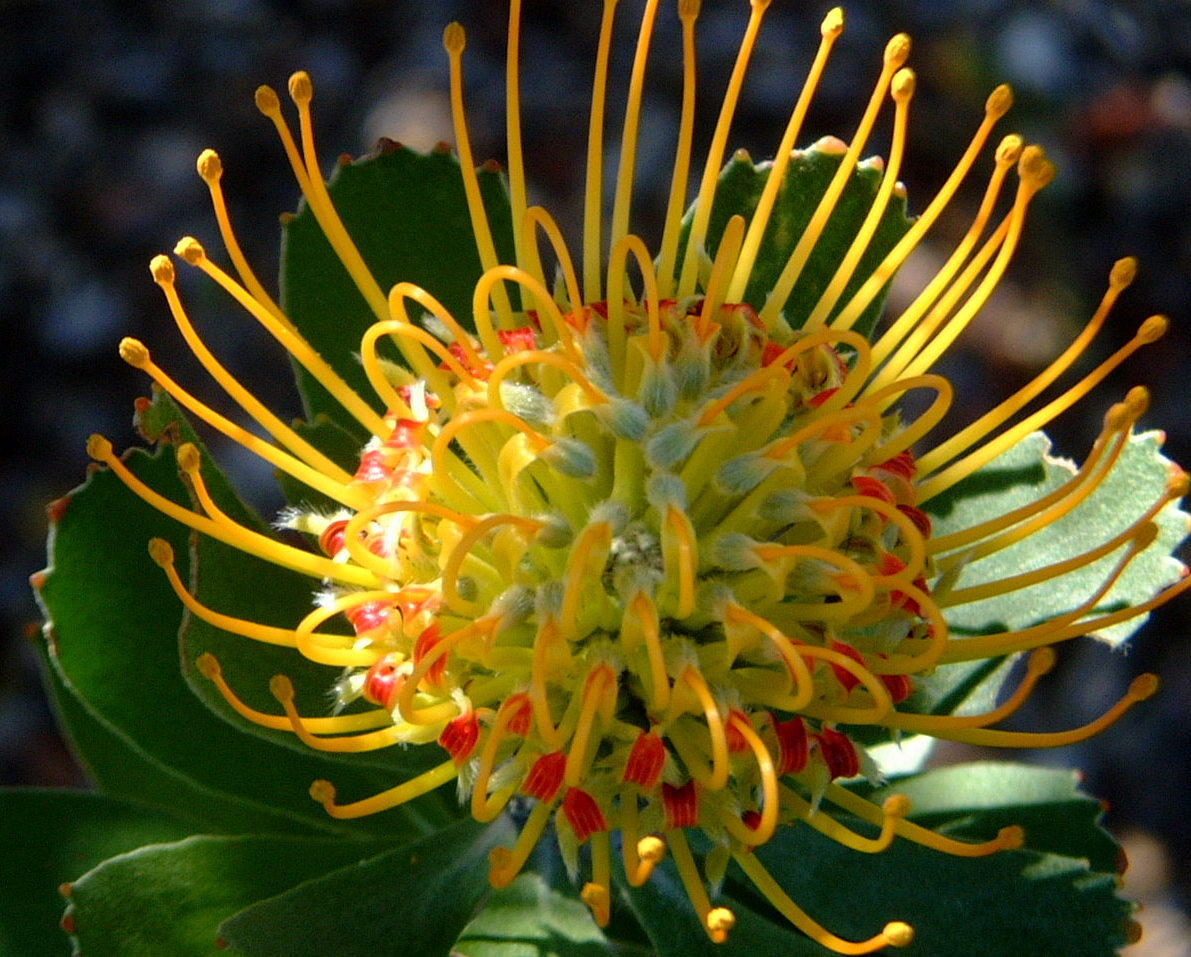
L. praecox

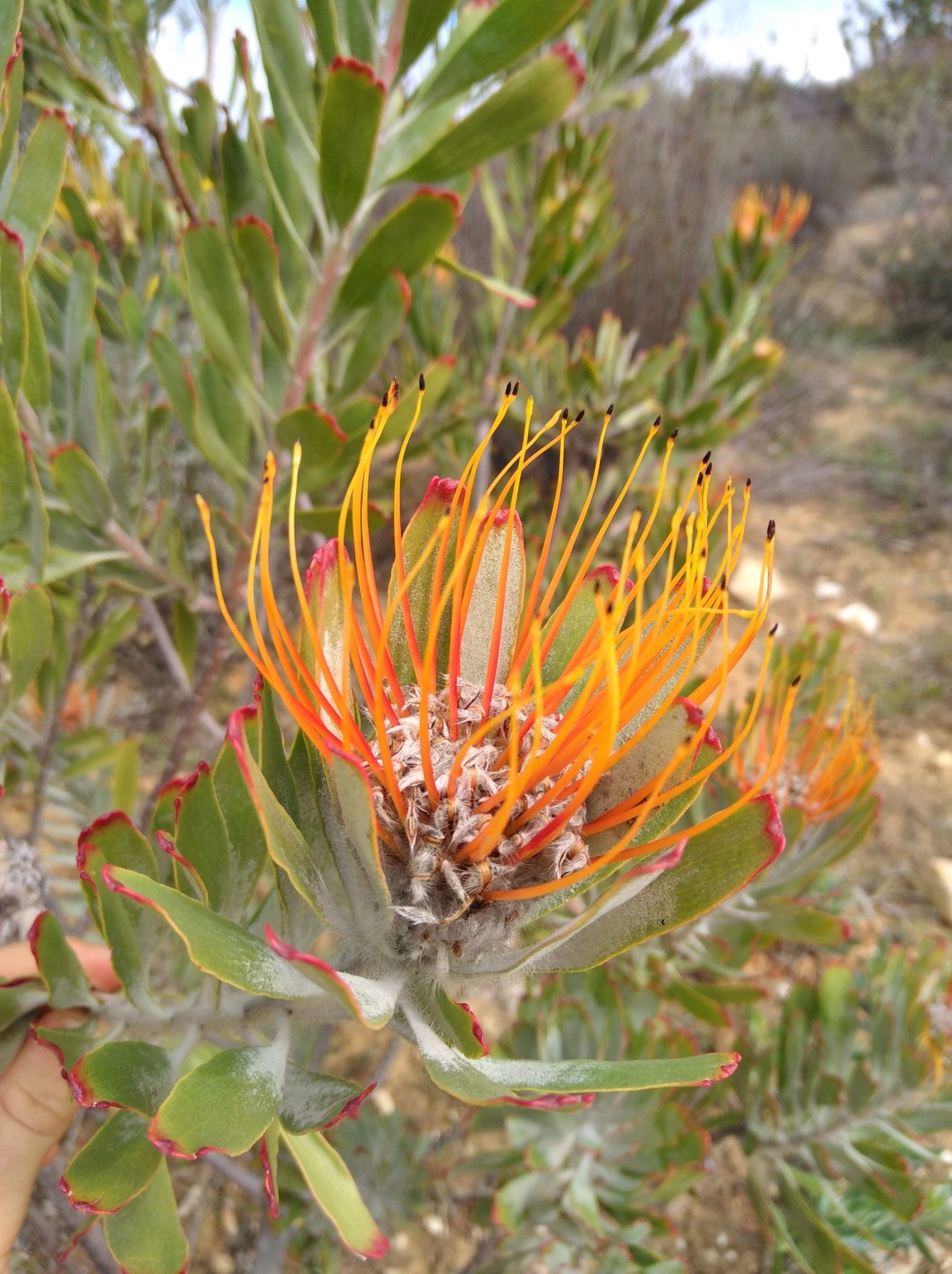
L. praemorsum

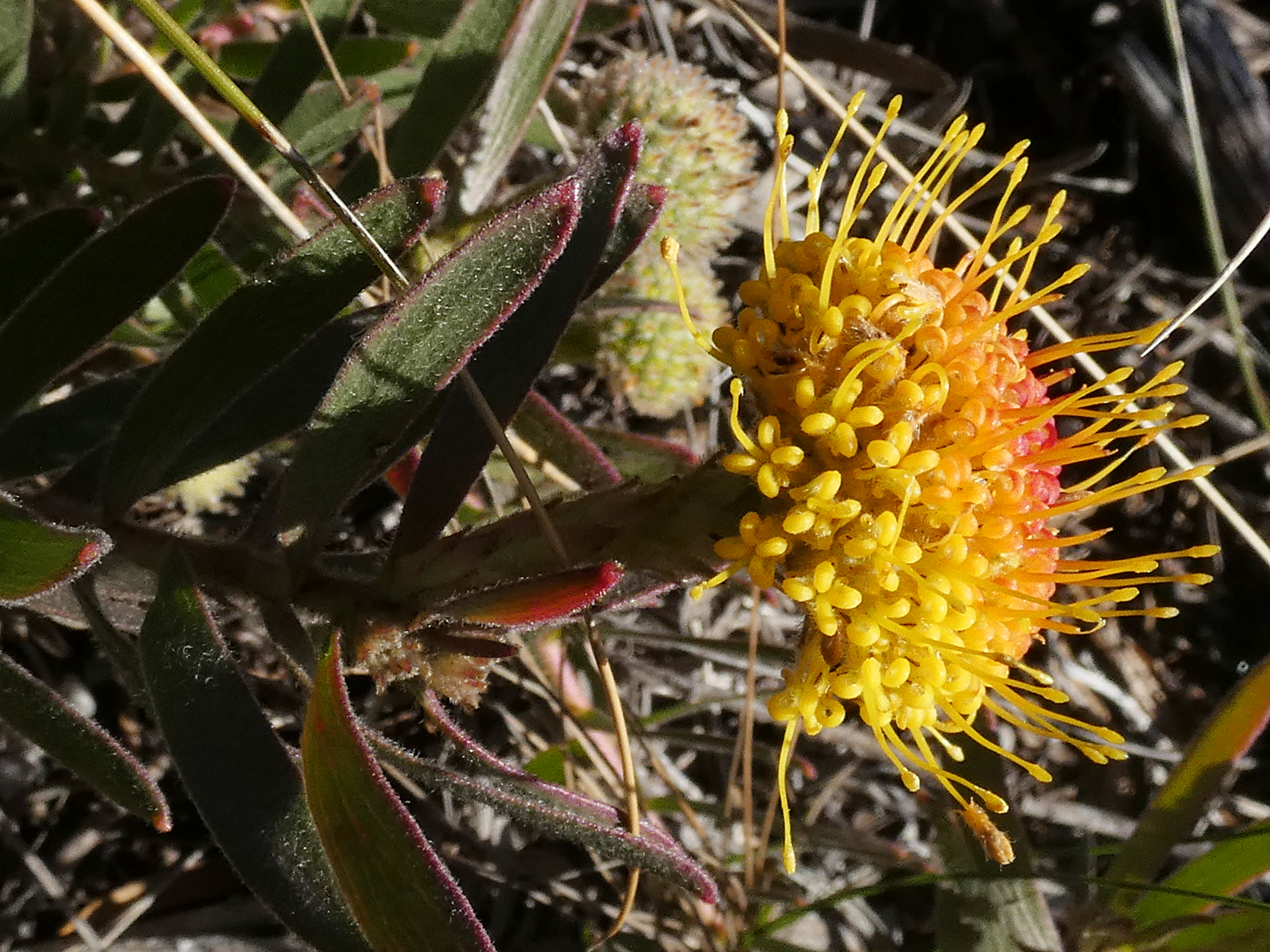
L. prostratum

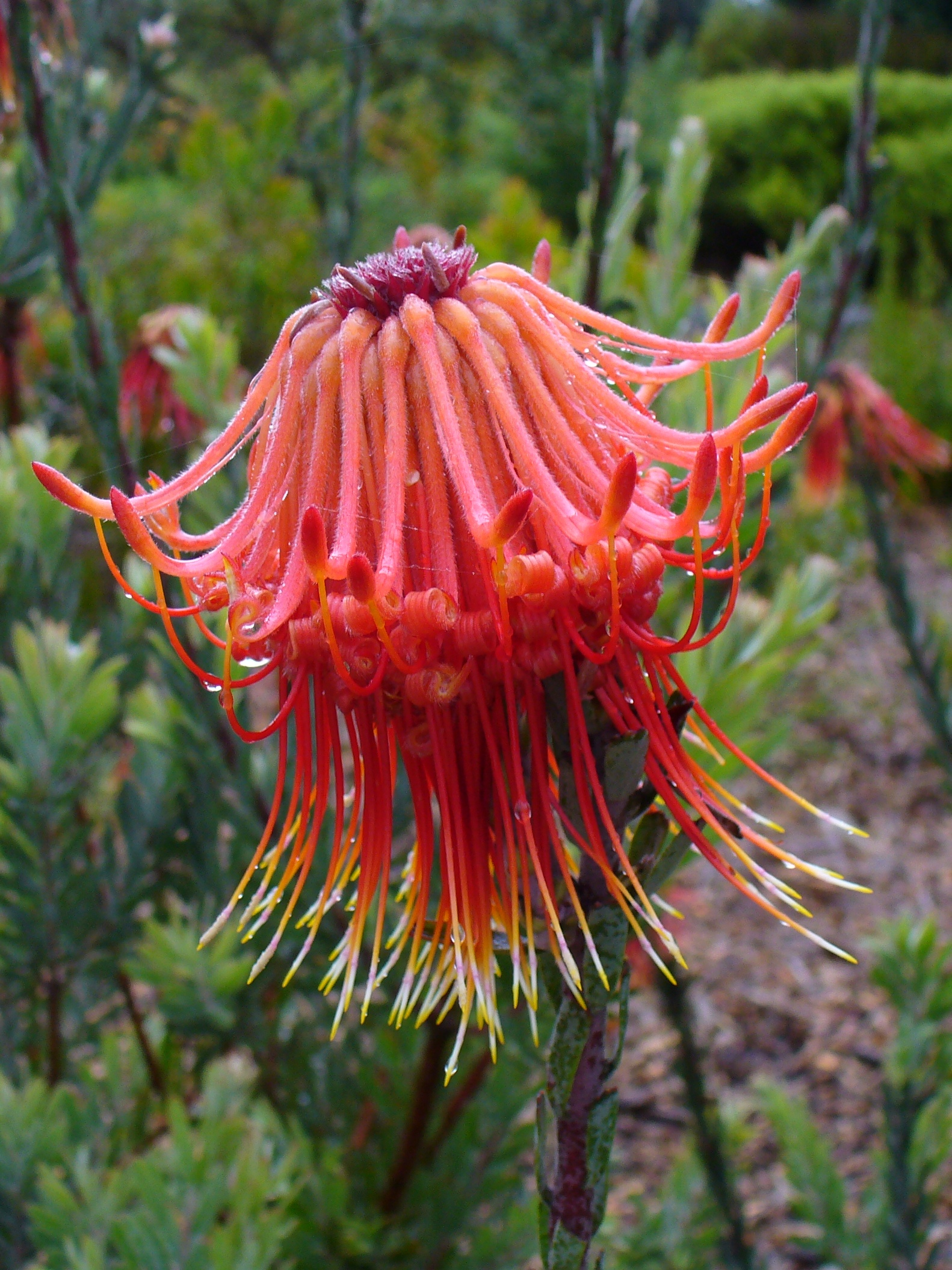
L. reflexum

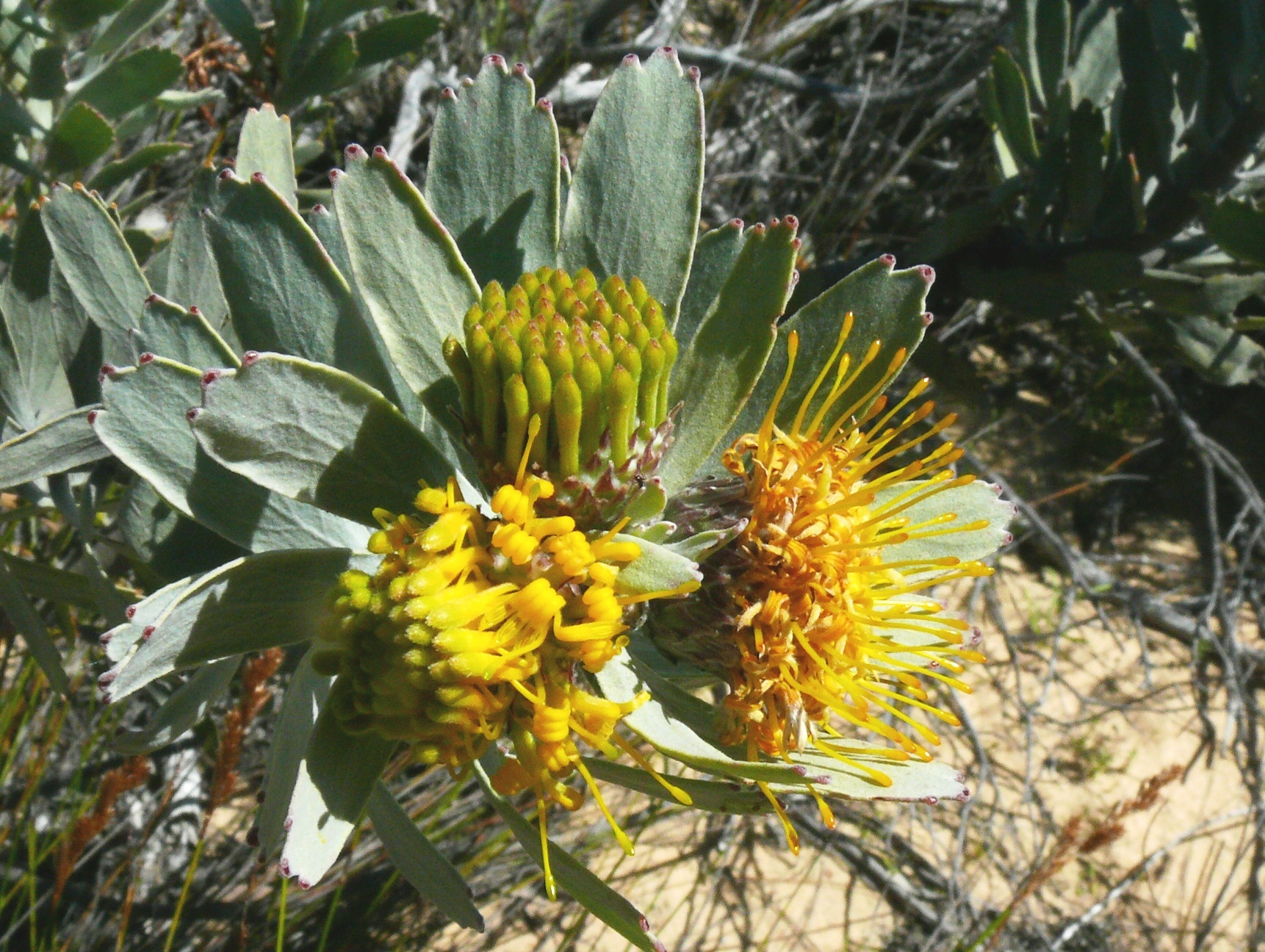
L. rodolentum

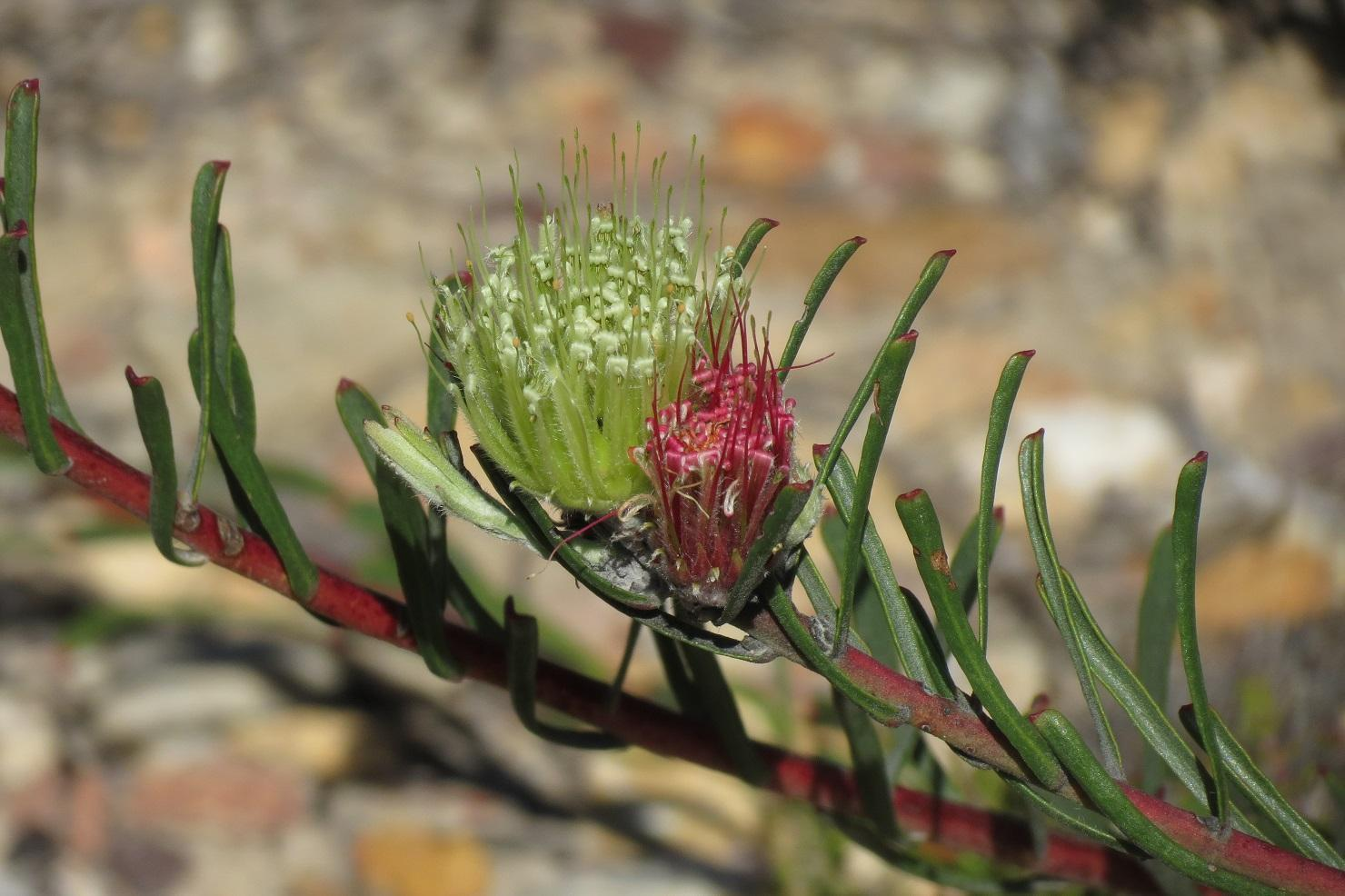
L. saxatile

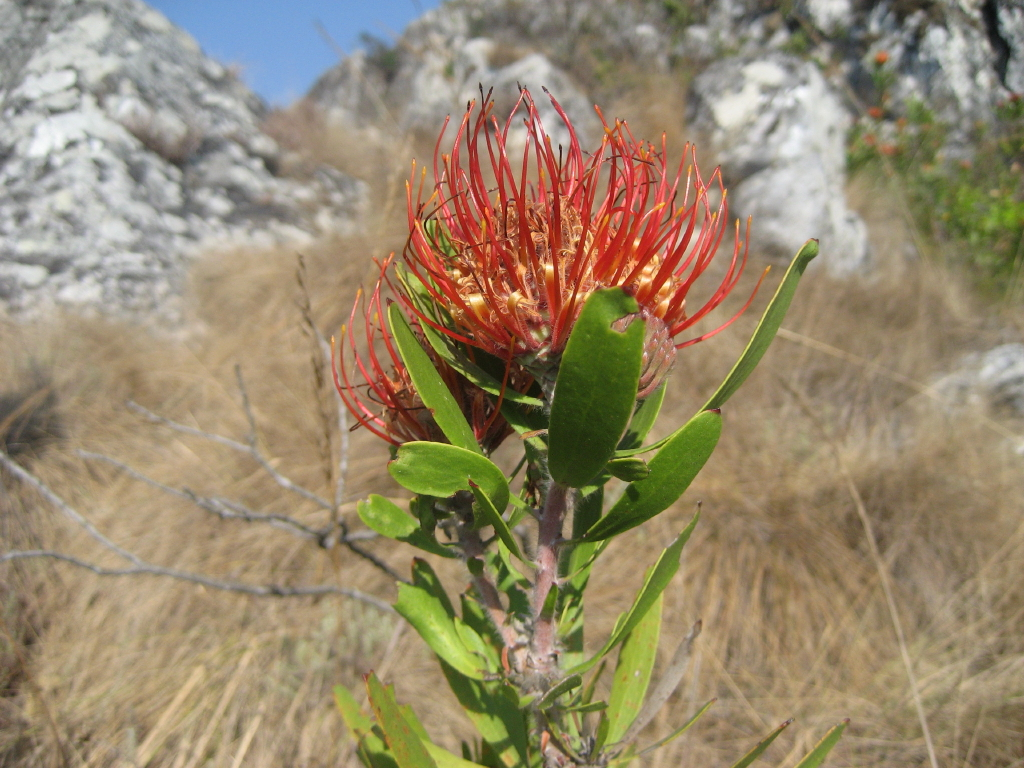
L. saxosum

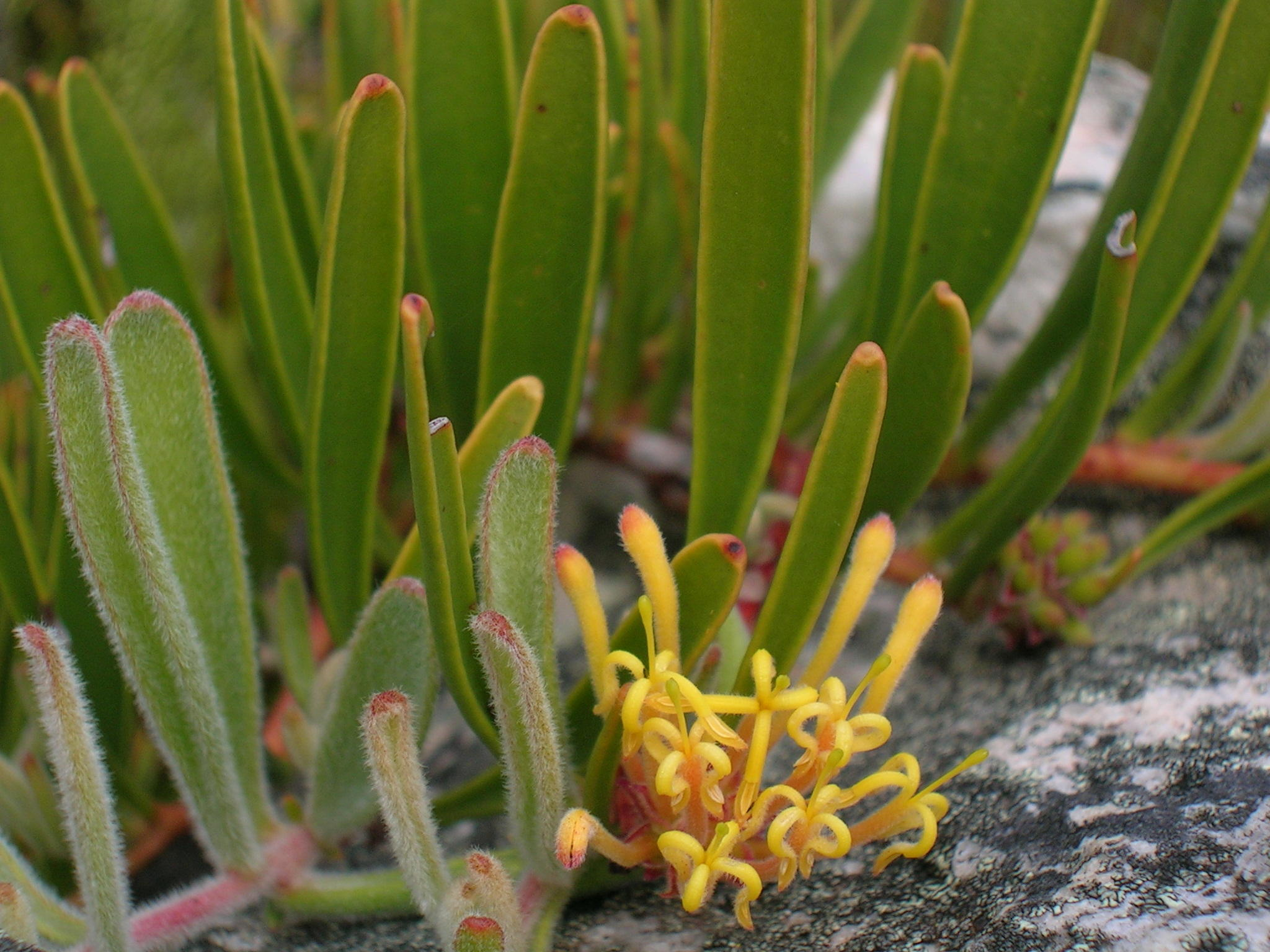
L. secundifolium

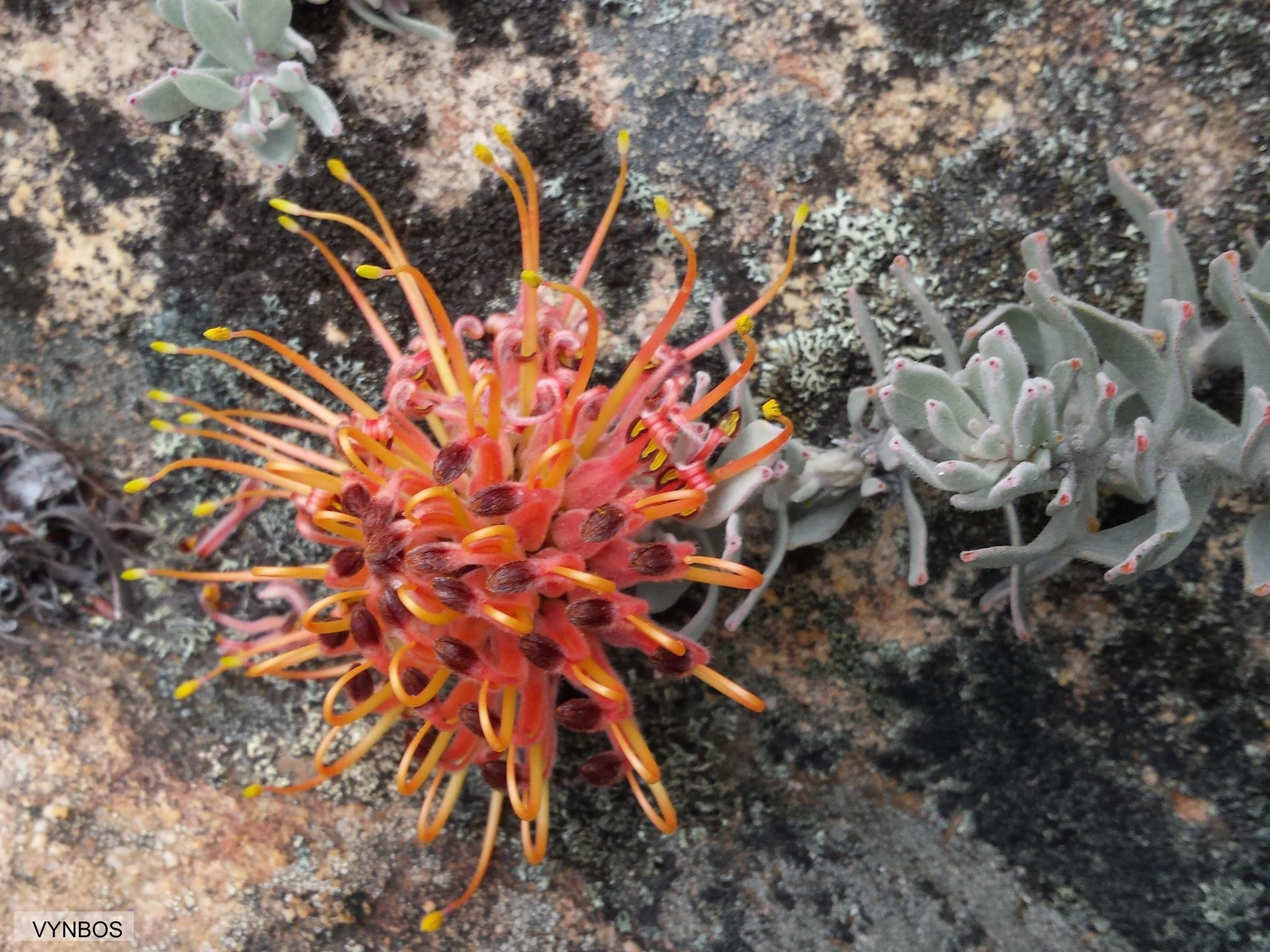
L. spathulatum

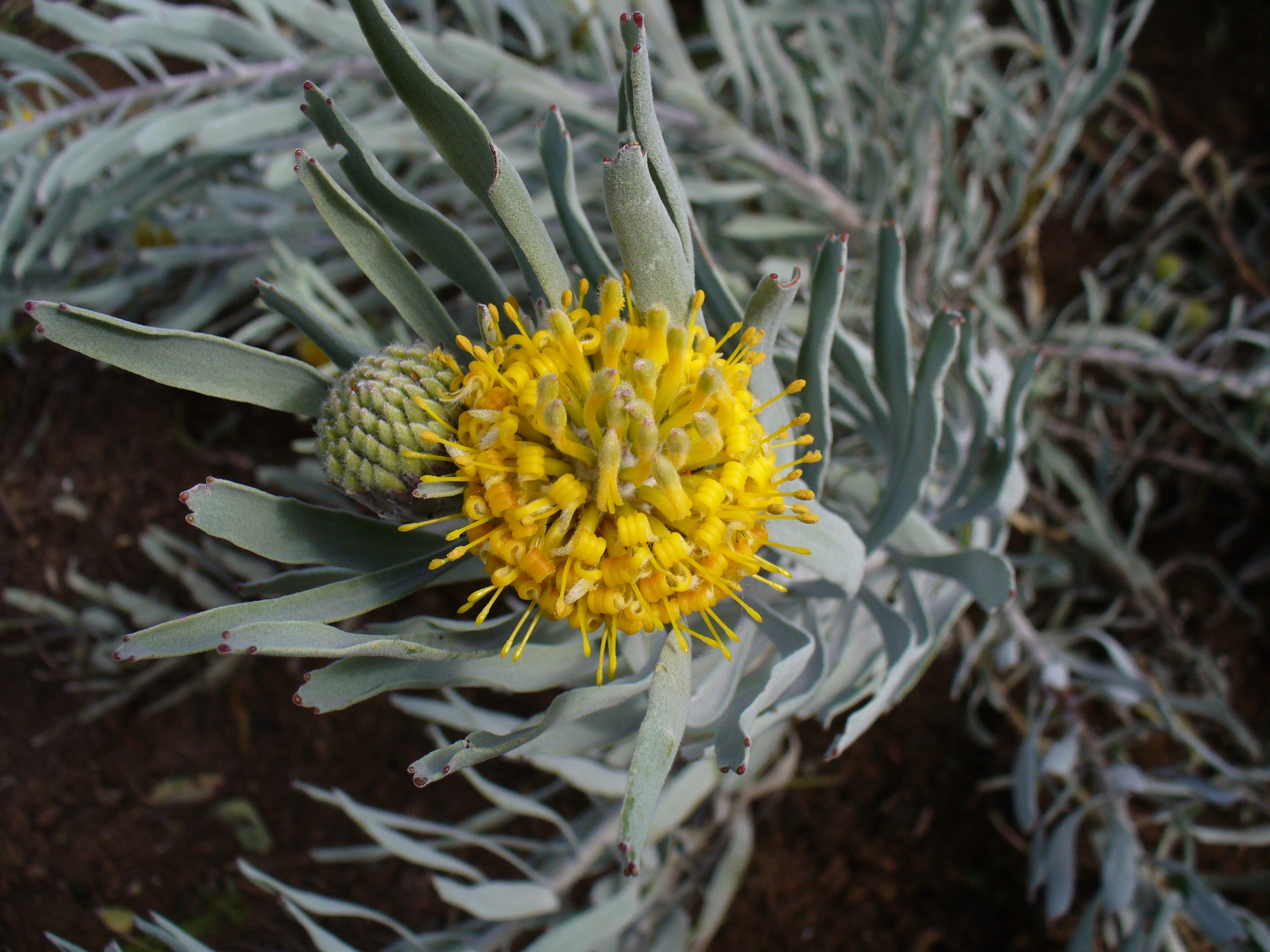
L. tomentosum

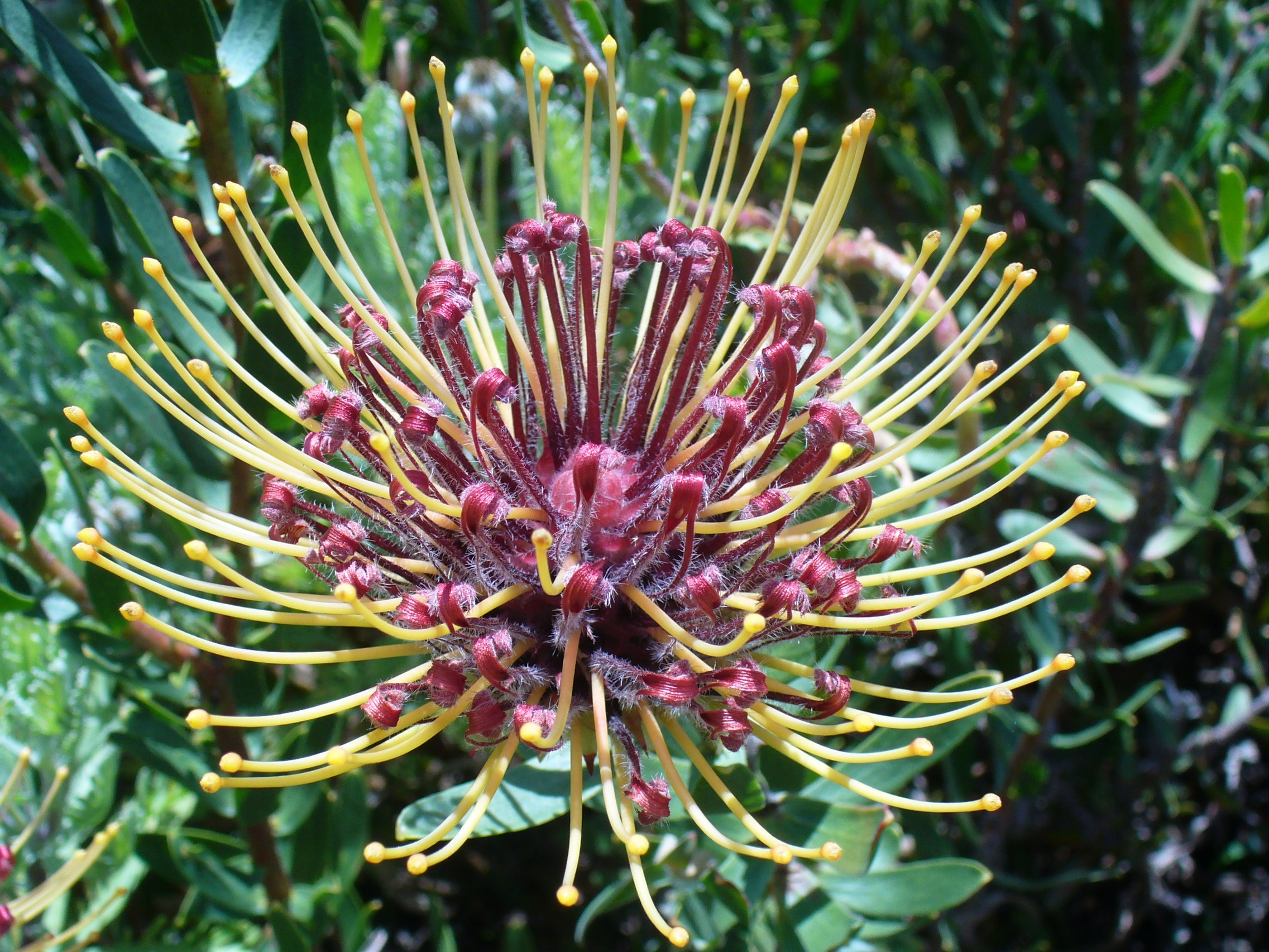
L. tottum

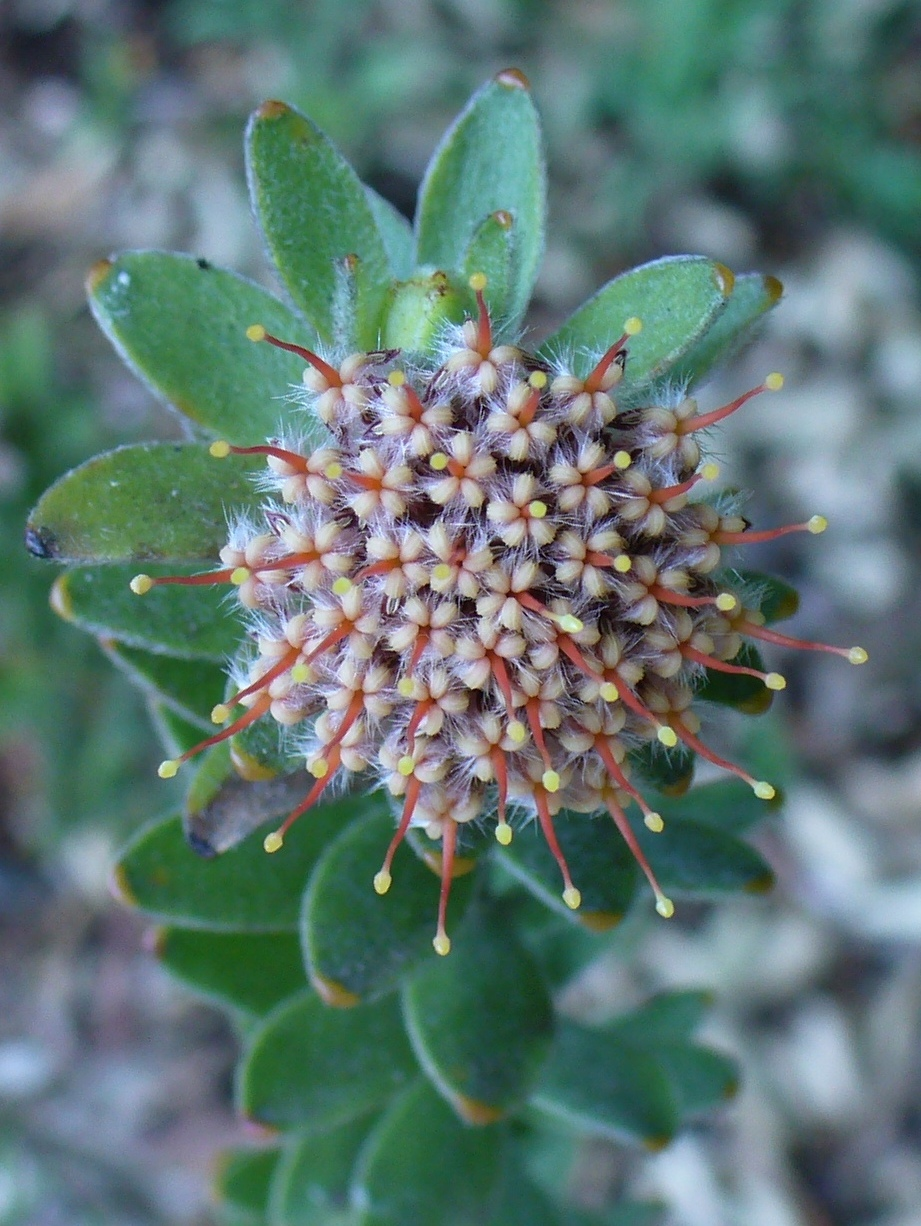
L. truncatulum

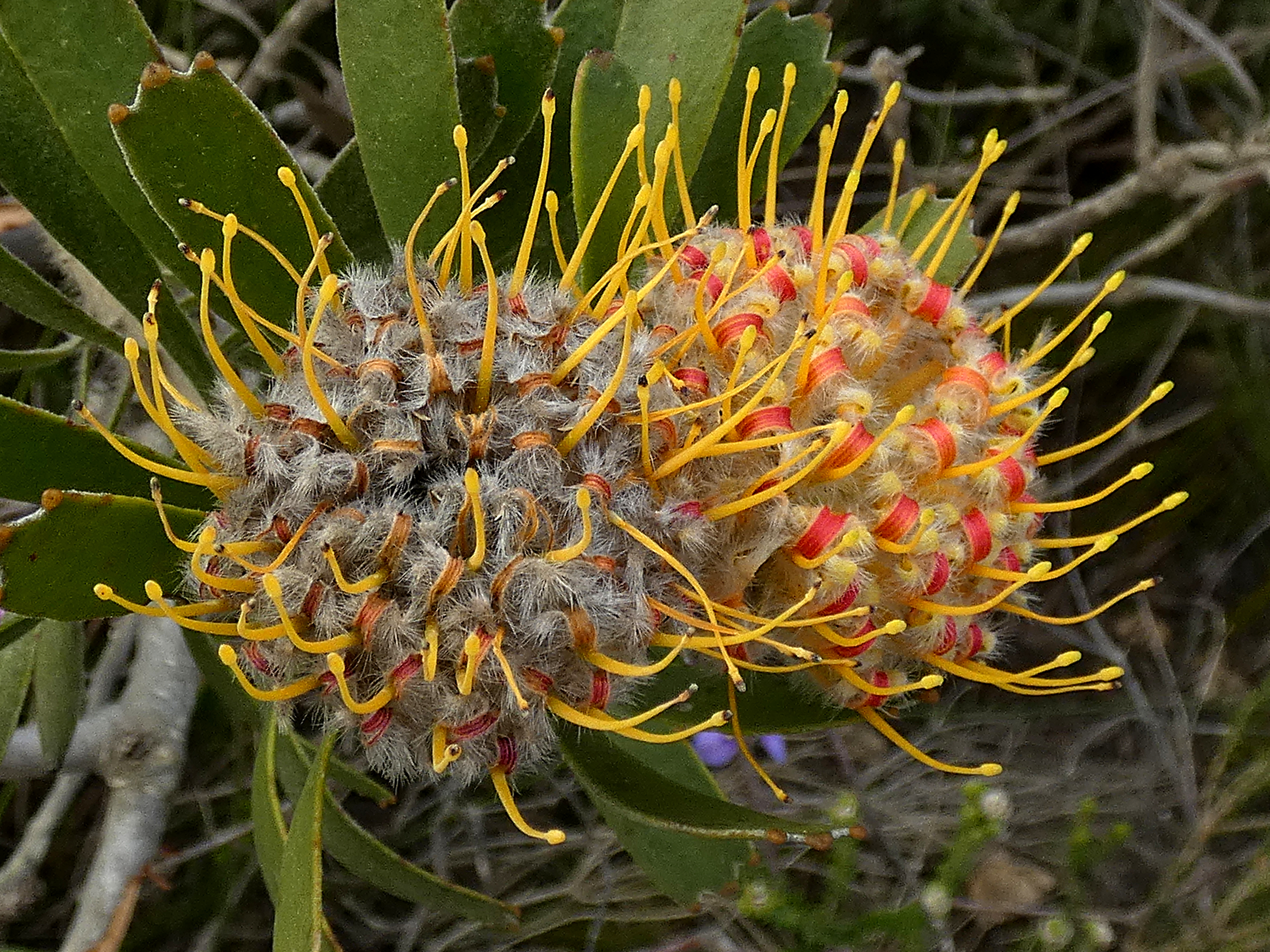
L. truncatum

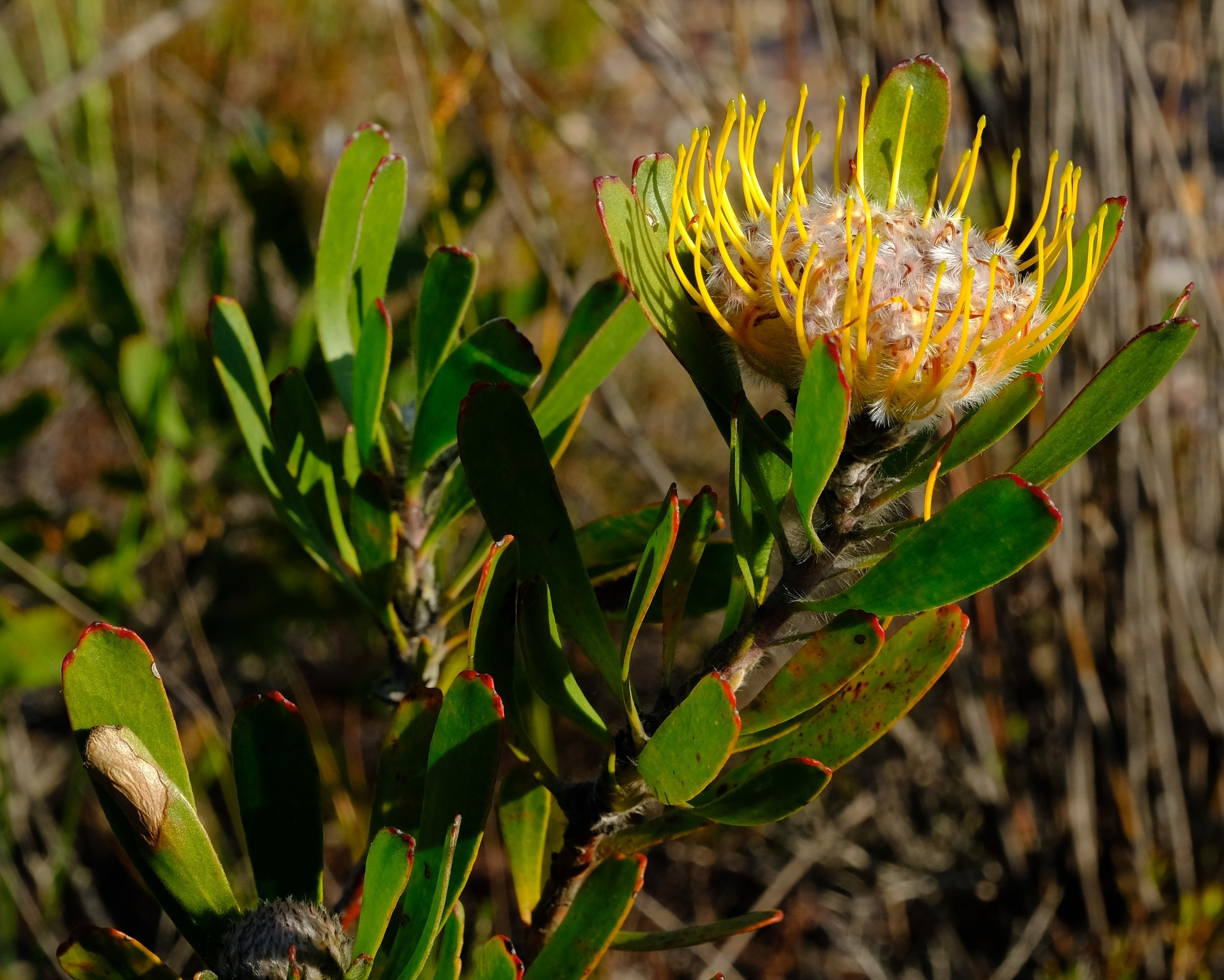
L. utriculosum

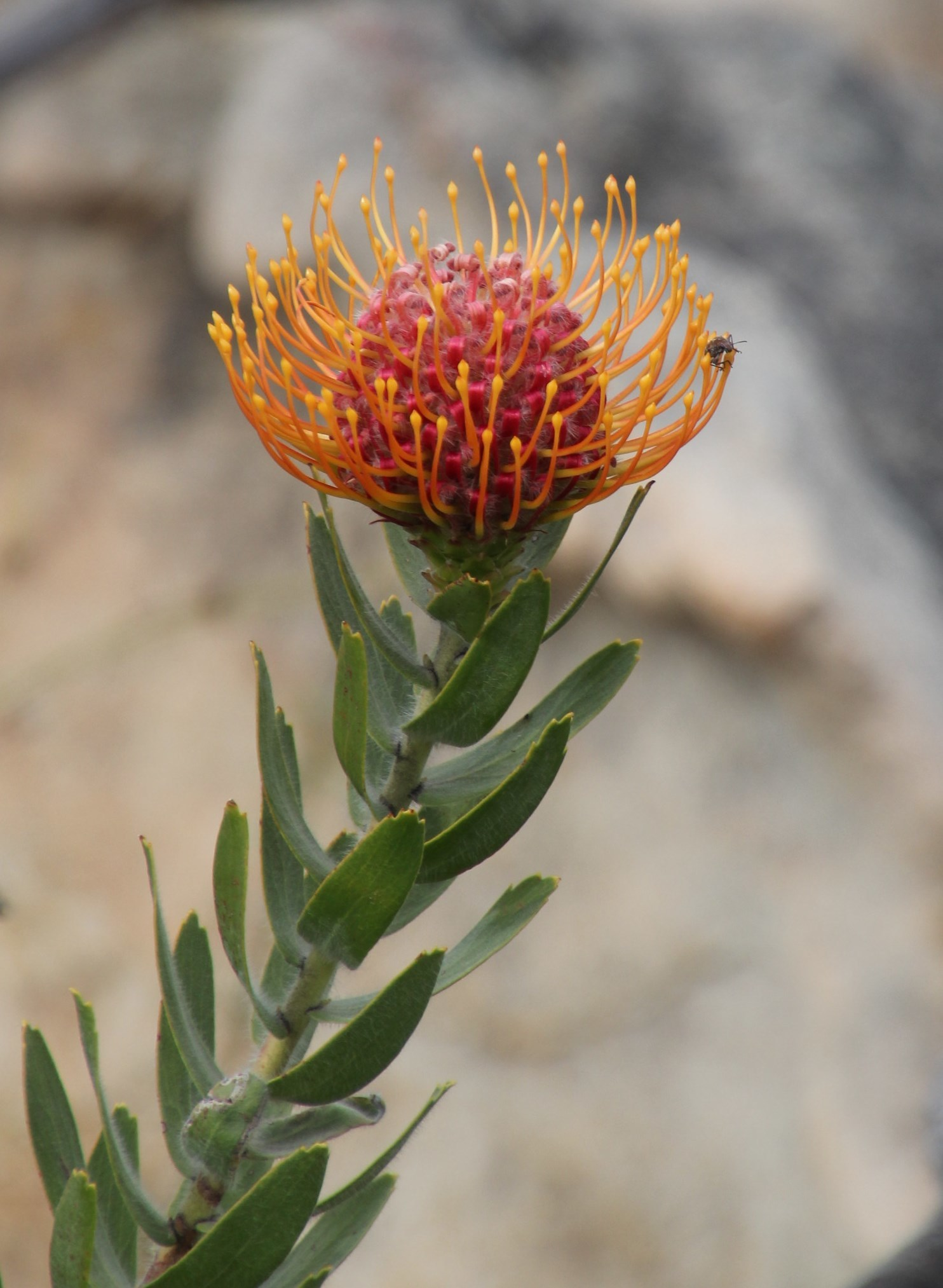
L. vestitum

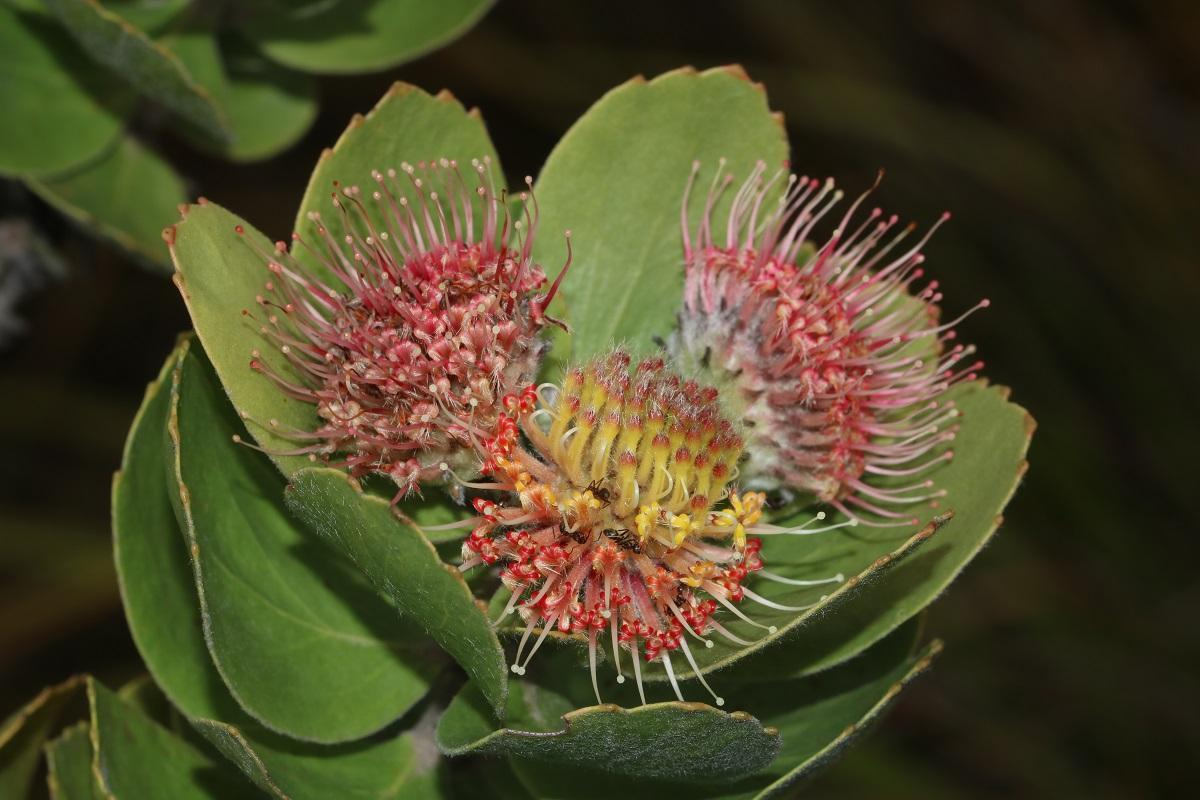
L. winteri

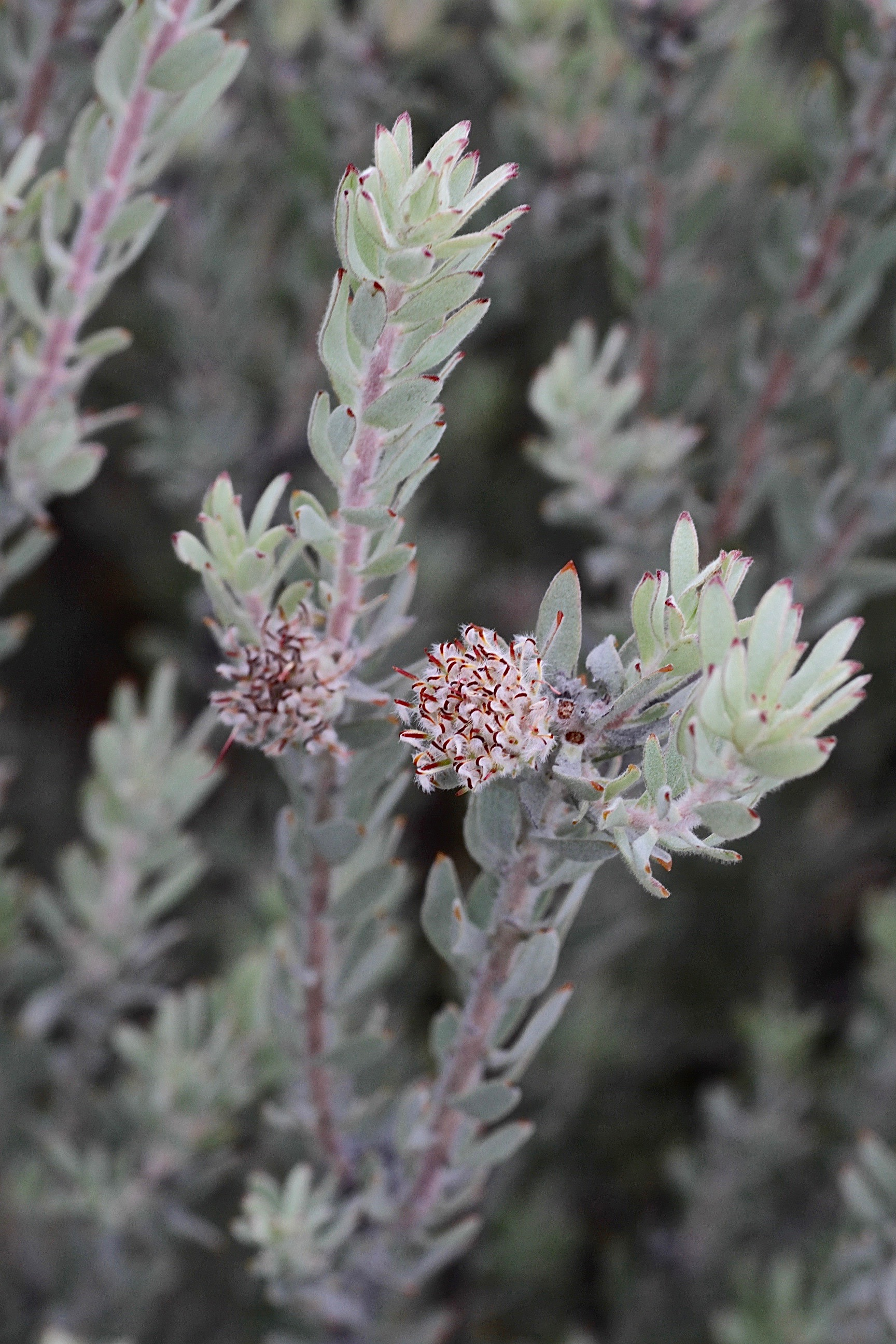
L. witte-bergense

=== Putative hybrids ===
In the field, sometimes few specimens are observed that are suspected to be interspecific hybrids, with characters that are intermediate between two clearly separate species. Wherever hybrids are observed in the wild, their origin is mostly quite clear because plants of the parent species grow nearby. The low number of such intermediate plants, suggests these hybrids are infertile. The following putative hybrids have been observed in gardens and in the field.

- L. hypophyllocarpodendron x L. pedunculatum
- L. hypophyllocarpodendron x L. calligerum
- L. mundii x L. calligerum
- L. truncatulum x L. prostratum
- L. truncatulum x L. gracile
- L. reflexum x L. catherinae
- L. conocarpodendron x L. cordifolium

Rourke suggested that L. tottum var. glabrum is probably the hybrid between L. tottum and L. vestitum. Many other hybrids have consciously been created and are propagated as ornamental or cut flower.

=== Reassigned species ===
The species that were originally described as, or moved to Leucospermum or one of its synonyms, which since have been reassigned include the following:

- L. alpinum subsp. alpinum = Vexatorella alpina
- L. alpinum subsp. amoenum = Vexatorella amoena
- L. glaberrimum = Leucadendron glaberrimum
- L. involucratum = Leucadendron salignum
- L. marginatum = Leucadendron spissifolium
- L. obtusatum = Vexatorella obtusata
- L. ovatum = Protea longiflora
- L. rochetianum = Faurea rochetiana
- L. zwartbergense = Leucadendron dregei

=== Names that cannot be assigned ===
For Leucadendron filiamentosum, L. polifolium and L. bellidifolium, no type specimens could be found, and their descriptions are too general to determine which Leucospermum species they are synonymous with. For L. obovatum, no description has been provided, so it is a nomen nudum.

== Distribution ==
Pincushions can only be found in a narrow zone from the southwestern Cape, along the Great Escarpment to eastern Transvaal and Eswatini, and two isolated areas, one in the Chimanimani Mountain range on the Zimbabwe-Mozambique border, and the other in Namaqualand. Only L. gerrardii, L. innovans and L. saxosum occur outside the Cape Floristic District. A remarkable concentration of 30% of the species occurs in a narrow strip of about 200 km (120 mi) long on the south coast between Hermanus and Witsand. Most of the individual species have restricted distributions, some as small as a few square km.

== Habitat ==
In the Cape, most Leucospermum species grow on acid soils that result from the weathering of Table Mountain Sandstone. More to the east a few species occur on eroded Witteberg quartzite, which is also very poor in nutrients. L. arenarium, L. fulgens, L. hypophyllocarpodendron, L. muirii, L. parile, L. praecox, L. rodolentum and L. tomentosum can only be encountered on deep white sands. A few other species like L. grandiflorum, L. guenzii and L. lineare can be found on the heavy clay that develops from Cape Granite. L. calligerum and L. heterophyllum sometimes grow on Malmsbury Gravel. On the other hand, L. patersonii and L. truncatum are specialists that only can be found on a ridge of limestone of the Alexandria Formation, parallel to the southern coast between Stilbaai and Danger Point.

== Ecology ==
=== Pollination ===
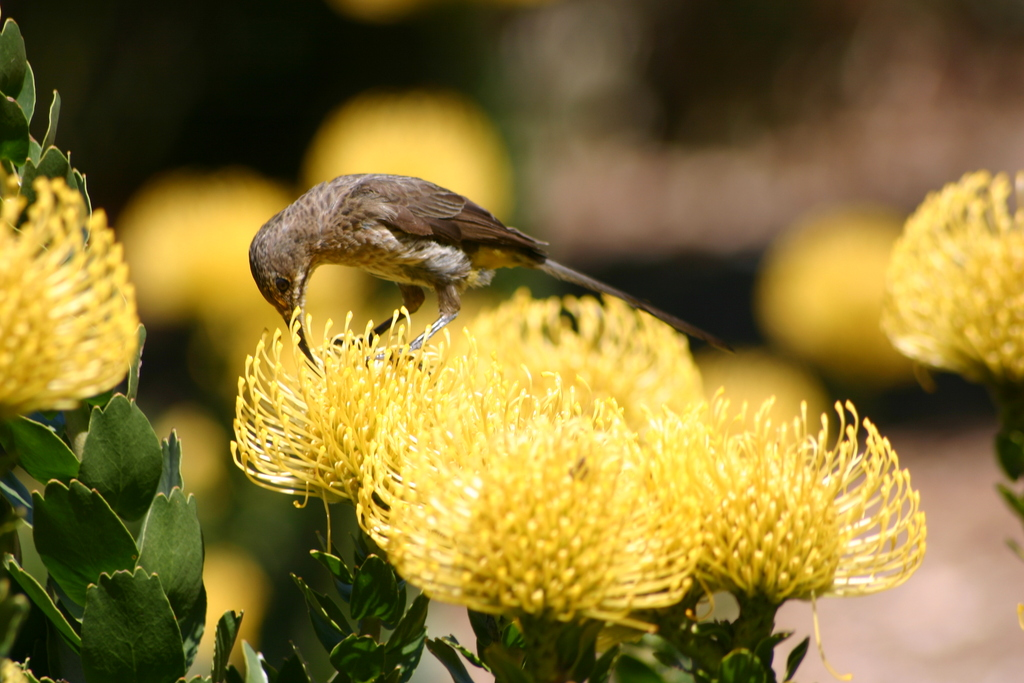
Cape sugarbird feeding in a garden

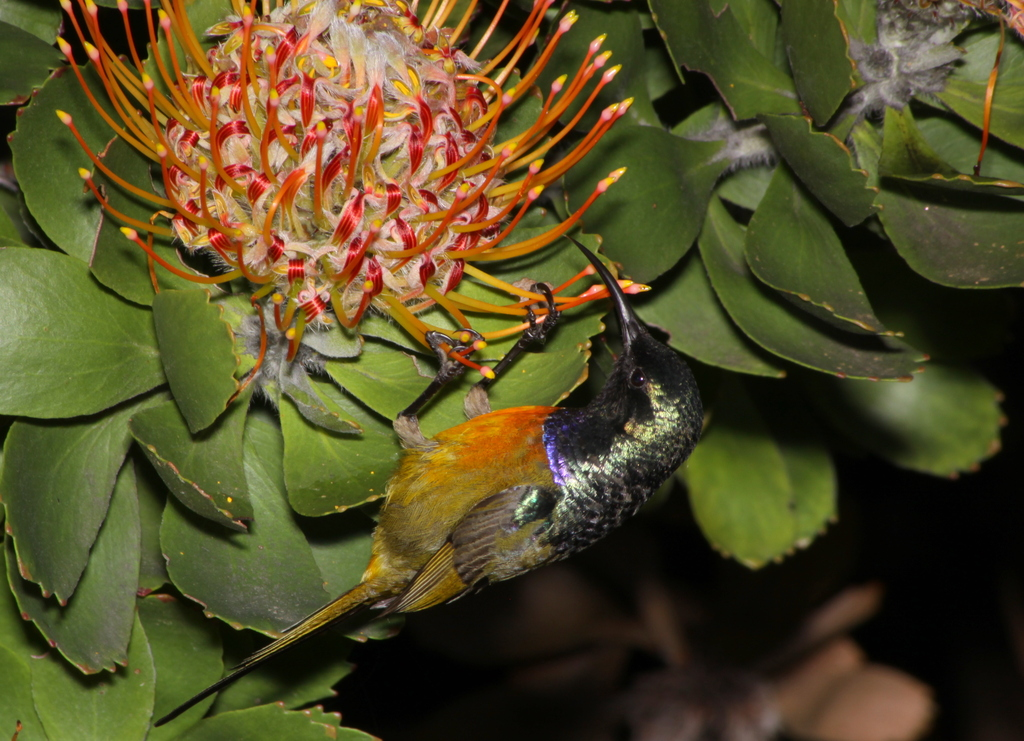
Orange-breasted sunbird

During flowering, the extended styles protrude far beyond the perianth tube. Initially, the tip of the style carries pollen at the thickened tip, that is called pollen-presenter. The pollen is brushed on the heads and bodies of the birds, mammals and large insects that try to reach the copious and thick nectar that fills the perianth tube. In older flower heads of Leucospermum most of the pollen will have been transferred to the bodies of earlier pollinators, and a small groove at the very tip of the style opens. In most Leucospermum species, plants are entirely infertile to their own pollen. Even a small amount of pollen of other specimens of the same species results in the development of the seed. The flowerheads are also visited by many small insects that are unlikely to pollinate Leucospermum, but the birds eat insects in addition to nectar. The birds' nesting season coincides with the flowering season of Leucospermum and both for egg-laying and growing chicks, a large quantity of proteine is needed, where nectar provides hardly any. The Cape sugarbird seems to be present in all stands of non-creeping Leucospermum species, but the malachite sunbird Nectarinia famosa, southern double-collared sunbird Cinnyris chalybeus and orange-breasted sunbird Anthobaphes violacea are locally also important pollinators. Red-winged starling Onychognathus morio and Cape weaver Ploceus capensis are occasional visitors that damage the perianth tube to extract the nectar, and are probably much less effective pollinators. Large monkey beetles, like Trichostetha fascicularis, T. capensis, T. albopicta, and Anisonyx ursus can for a time be feeding on Leucospermum nectar in large numbers, and do transport pollen on their long hairs. These are however only present during a few weeks each year, and likely less important pollinators than the birds. Several rodents may be responsible for the pollination of species that produce their flower heads at ground level. Hairy-footed gerbils Gerbillurus paeba, and striped field mice Rhabdomys pumilio were observed to visit the flowers of L. arenarium, and both carried its pollen on forehead and breast. L. arenarium nectar is thick and is present at the tips of the perianth lobes. Here, mice can lick it off without having to damage the flowers. The nectar is produced by the scales subtending the ovary as in other Leucospermum species, but is transported by capillary ducts to the tips of the perianth.

=== Seed dispersal ===
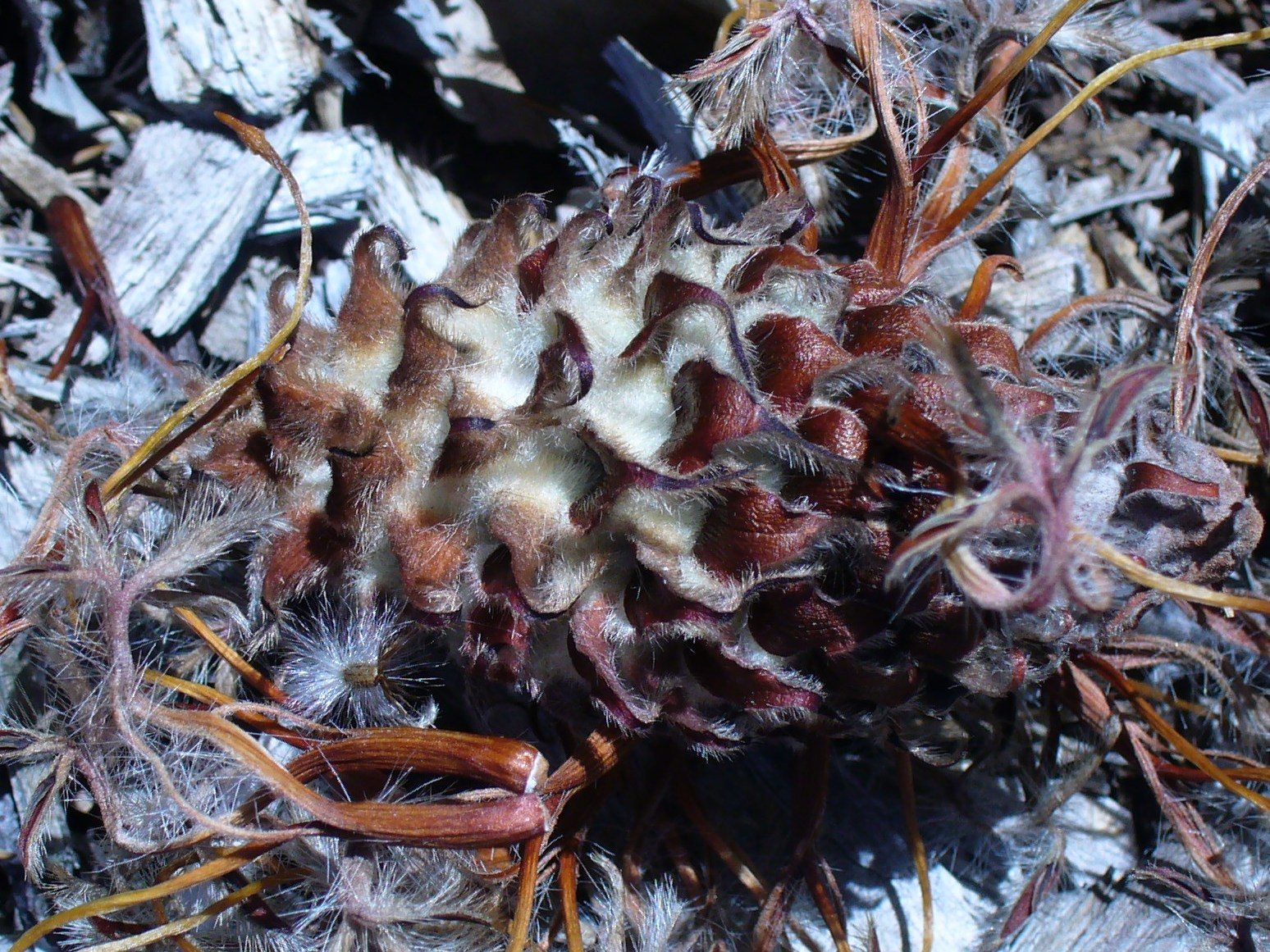
Seedhead of Leucospermum glabrum

The fruits of Leucadendron have but one seed cavity, that does not open, and contains only one seed, a fruit type called nut. The fruits consist partly of a whitish, fleshy or gelatinous pericarp, a so-called elaiosome, that attracts ants because they contain chemicals that mimic pheromones. After the fruits fall from the plant, mostly Anoplolepis ants gather them, and carry them to their nest by sinking their jaws in the fleshy elaiosome. Once in the underground nests, the elaiosome is consumed. The smooth and hard seeds that remain do not fit the ants' small jaws, and are abandoned, protected from fire and seed eaters. The survival of the seeds is further enhanced by fungicidal and anti-bacterial substances that the ants excrete to keep their nests in a healthy condition. In the fynbos, this so-called myrmecochory is a strategy used by many plant species to survive the fire. Invasive ants species, like in South Africa Linepithema humile (Argentine ant), destroy the nests of the indigenous ants, and eat the elaiosomes where ever the seed has fallen, so that it is not protected against fire and can easily be found and eaten by mice and birds.

=== Fire ===
Periodic wildfires are an important factor in south and west South Africa. The occurrence of these fires among other things determines the extent of fynbos. All species that naturally occur in the fynbos have adaptations that ensure these species can survive the natural fire regime, but different species have different strategies. This is also true for the species of Leucospermum, even the few that occur outside the fynbos. A large majority of Leucospermum species is killed by fire because these have a single stem that only branches higher up, and are covered by a rather thin bark. One year after the fire however, many seedlings have occurred. All specimens within the area covered by the most recent fire, are therefore of the same age. After three to four years, these plants begin to flower and produce seeds, that do not yet germinate, but remain in the soil seed bank, until they get activated during the aftermath of a fire. Specimens belonging to these species are subject to biological aging (or senescence), and lose their vitality. The maximum life expectancy differs between twenty-five to thirty years in smaller species like L. truncatulum and L. oleifolia, to fifty to eighty years in L. praemorsum. For this group of species, fire is a prerequisite to rejuvenate and so maintain the population. If the fires occur as frequent as every two or three year however, the soil seed bank gets depleted because no new seeds are added, and the species may locally disappear. A number of large species (L. conocarpodendron, L. heterophyllum, L. patersonii, L. pedunculatum, L. profugum and L. royenifolium) have thick bark, which allows them to survive fires if these are not too intense, and so stretch their lifespan regularly beyond the interval between successive incidents. The fire survival rate in this group was estimated at 30–50 %. Since the fire destroys lower branches, regrowth only takes place from the higher branches, and the plants attain an umbrella-shape. A smaller group of Leucospermum species has a more effective method to survive fire. Above ground parts of these species die, but new shoots appear directly from the ground from woody tubers. This mechanism is best developed in the species of the section Crassicaudex (L. cuneiforme, L. gerrardii, L. innovans and L. saxosum) that mostly occur outside the fynbos, in areas with dominant summer rainfall where fires may be more frequent, but is also present in L. hypophyllocarpodendron, L. prostratum and L. tomentosum. The survival rate in this group is estimated at 95% or more. The young plants of these species can be distinguished because of the profuse development of side branches very low on the primary stem.

== Conservation ==
There are 48 species, two of which having two subspecies each. Two others have two varieties each. The survival of eight is considered to be of least concern: L. calligerum, L. cuneiforme, L. oleifolium, L. pedunculatum, L. royenifolium, L. truncatum, L. utriculosum and L. wittebergensis. Twelve taxa are regarded as near-threatened: L. bolusii, L. conocarpodendron subsp. viridum, L. cordifolium, L. gerrardii, L. gracile, L. pluridens, L. reflexum (its two varieties have not been evaluated), L. spathulatum, L. tottum var. tottum, L. truncatulum, L. vestitum and L. winteri. Three species are rare: L. erubescens, L. mundii and L. secundifolium. Nine taxa are regarded as vulnerable: both subspecies of L. hypophyllocarpodendron, L. lineare, L. patersonii, L. praecox, L. praemorsum, L. prostratum, L. rodolentum and L. tomentosum. Fifteen have been categorised as endangered species: L. catharinae, L. conocarpodendron subsp. conocarpodendron, L. cordatum, L. formosum, L. glabrum, L. grandiflorum, L. gueinzii, L. hamatum, L. heterophyllum, L. innovans, L. muirii, L. parile, L. profugum, L. saxatile and L. saxosum. Finally, four taxa are thought to be critically endangered: L. arenarium, L. fulgens, L. harpagonatum and L. tottum var. glabrum.

== Cultivation ==
The breeding of pincushions provides an important export product in South Africa and a few other countries. L. conocarpodendron, L. cordifolia, L. lineare, L. patersonii and L. vestitum and a range of hybrids supply cut flowers.
