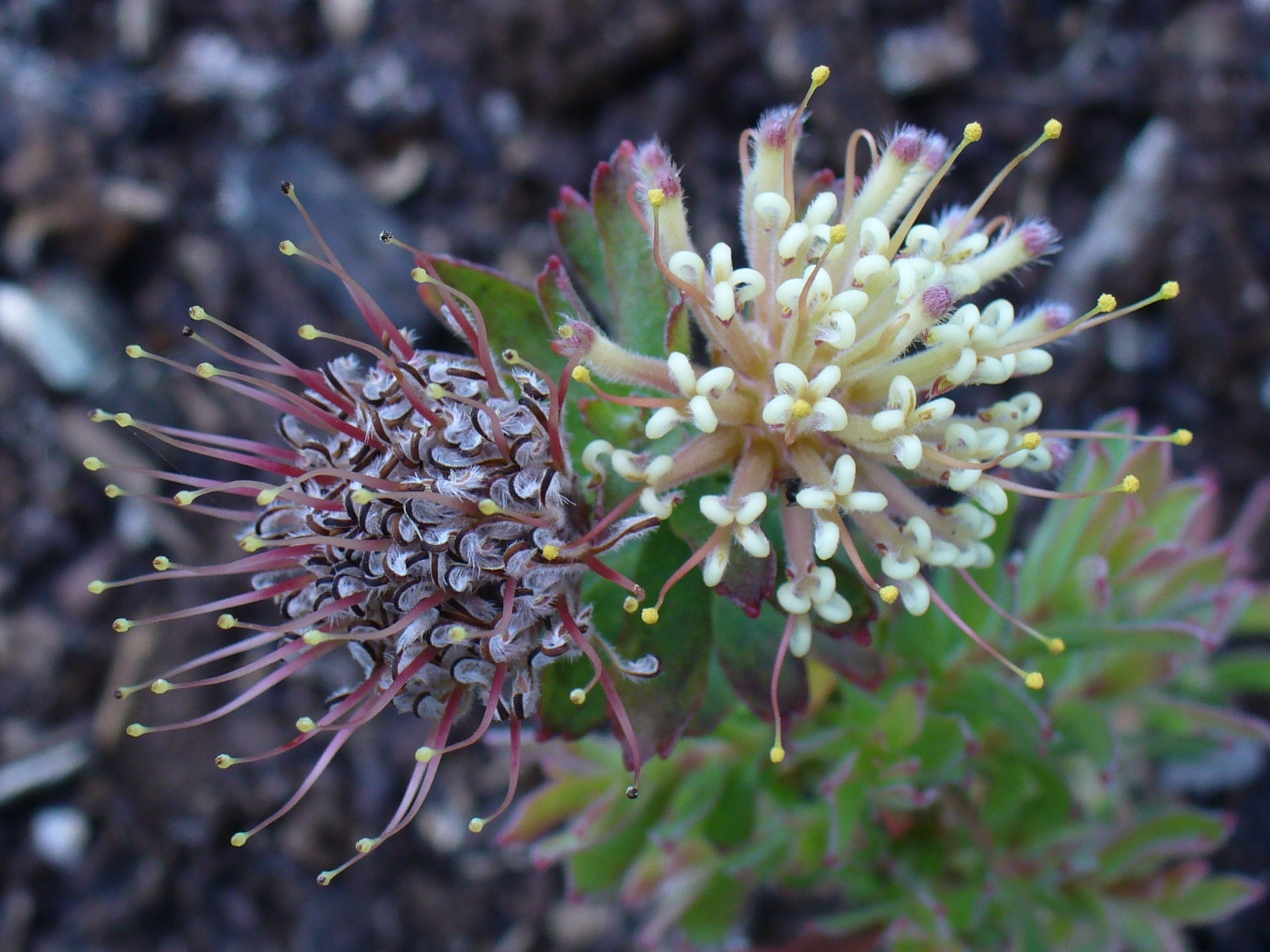

Conservation status
- Vulnerable (IUCN 3.1)

Scientific classification
- Kingdom: Plantae
- Clade: Embryophytes
- Clade: Tracheophytes
- Clade: Angiosperms
- Clade: Eudicots
- Order: Proteales
- Family: Proteaceae
- Genus: Leucospermum
- Species: L. heterophyllum

Binomial name
- Leucospermum heterophyllum (Thunb.) Rourke

Synonyms
- Protea heterophylla, Leucadendron heterophyllum; Leucospermum patulum, Protea patens Poir. (auct. non Protea patens R.Br. = Protea holosericea); Leucospermum lemmerzianum

= Leucospermum heterophyllum =

Species of plant native to South Africa

Leucospermum heterophyllum is a low, trailing evergreen shrublet of up to 15 cm (5.9 in) high, and up to several m in diameter, which is assigned to the family Proteaceae. It has narrow leaves of about 2 1/2 cm (0.98 in) long and 1/2 cm (0.20 in) wide, mostly with three teeth near its tip. It has small, globe-shaped, whitish flower heads. It is called trident pincushion in English and rankluisie in Afrikaans. It naturally occurs in the Western Cape province of South Africa. The plant flowers between August and January.

== Description ==
L. heterophyllum is an evergreen, low shrublet of 10–15 cm (3.9–5.9 in) high, which spreads into a dense mat of 1–6 m (3.3–19.7 ft) in diameter from a stout rootstock of 5–10 cm (2.0–3.9 in) thick and the basal stems also sturdy and up to 5 cm thick. Long branches are radiating out, trailing along the ground, and mostly bear flower heads on slender, short shoots to the sides of 1–2 mm (0.039–0.079 in) thick. The leaves are narrow, line-shaped and fanning out slightly or lance-shaped with the largest width towards the tip, 2–3 cm (0.79–1.18 in) long and 3–6 mm (0.12–0.24 in) wide, the tip mostly broad with three teeth with bony tips, usually shortly felty hairy but later losing the hairs, without a stalk, twisted at base and more or less oriented upwards.

The flower heads are globe-shaped, 2–3 cm (0.79–1.18 in) in diameter and set on a stalk of 1–2 cm (0.39–0.79 in) long. The common base of the flowers in the same head is low egg-shaped, 2–3 mm (0.079–0.118 in) across, and subtended by an involucre consisting of overlapping cartilaginous, softly hairy oval bracts of 3–4 mm (0.12–0.16 in) long and 1–2 mm (0.039–0.079 in) wide with a recurved, pointy tip with a sparse tuft of long stiff hairs. The bracts subtending the individual flower are woolly on the outside, broadly oval in shape about 3 mm long and 2 mm wide, with a pointy tip. The 4-merous perianth is about 1 1/2 cm (0.59 in) long. The lower part where the lobes remain merged when the flower has opened (called tube) is about 4 mm (0.16 in) long, hairless at base, constricted and slightly felty where it changes in the middle part (or claws) where the perianth is split lengthwise. These claws are felty hairy and pale greenish yellow in colour and are all coiled back when the flower has opened. The upper part (or limbs), which enclosed the pollen presenter in the bud consists of four dark brown, lance-shaped lobes of about 1 mm (0.039 in) long, which are softly hairy on the outside, and are each merged on the inside with one yellow anther of ¾ mm (0.03 in) long with a pointy tip. From the perianth emerges a straight style of 18–21 mm (0.71–0.83 in) long, tapering in the upper third, initially pale yellow but later becoming dull carmine in colour. The thickened part at the tip of the style called pollen presenter is yellow in colour, cone- to egg-shaped with a groove across its very tip. The ovary is subtended by four opaque line- to thread-shaped scales of about 2 mm (0.079 in) long. The flowers of Leucospermum heterophyllum are scented.

=== Differences with related species ===
The trident pincushion can be distinguished from its nearest relatives by the combination of a creeping habitus, eventually hairless, lance-shaped leaves that have three teeth and are widest near the tip, which are upright and twisted at base.

== Taxonomy ==
The trident pincushion was first described in 1781 by "the father of South African botany", Carl Peter Thunberg, as Protea heterophylla. Robert Brown in 1810 described another specimen as Leucospermum patulum. Otto Kuntze assigned Thunberg's species to his genus Leucadendron, making the new combination Leucadendron heterophyllum in 1891. Jean Louis Marie Poiret described Protea patens in Jean-Baptiste Lamarck's Encyclopédie méthodique: Botanique of 1816, a superfluous name because it is based on the same specimen that Robert Brown had called Leucospermum patulum. Furthermore, Poiret's specimen is not identical to Protea patens as described by Robert Brown in 1810. Protea patens R.Br. itself is a later synonym of Erodendrum holosericeum Salisb. ex Knight, that was later reassigned to Protea by Rourke. In 1900 Rudolf Schlechter described Leucospermum lemmerzianum. John Patrick Rourke regarded these names as synonymous in 1967 and made the new combination Leucospermum heterophyllum.

The trident pincushion has been assigned to the section Diastelloidea.

The species name heterophyllum is compounded from the Ancient Greek words ἕτερος (héteros) meaning "different" and φύλλον (phúllon) meaning "leaf".

== Distribution, habitat and ecology ==
L. heterophyllum is an endemic species restricted to just a few square miles on the Agulhas plains between Bredasdorp in the northeast, Elim in the west, and Soetendalsvlei in the south.

The species can mostly be found on a conglomerate Table Mountain Sandstone and quartzite that crops out at a few places near Bredasdorp. Rarely it also grows on weathered fine-grained graywacke, a conglomerate of the Malmesbury series or exceptionally on Tertiary sand deposits. It grows in a low and sparse vegetation mainly consisting of vegetation Restionaceae, Erica species and Thymelaeaceae. Within its range, the average annual precipitation is 375–500 mm (14.8–19.7 in), mainly falling during the southern winter.

After a fire, this species can often sprout from the basal branches, which are somewhat fire resistant due to a reasonably thick bark.

== Conservation ==
The trident pincushion is regarded an endangered species due to introduced species that supplant the original vegetation, and because more than half of its habitat was lost in the last hundred years. This is the result of urban sprawl, overgrazing, agriculture and mining of gravel.
