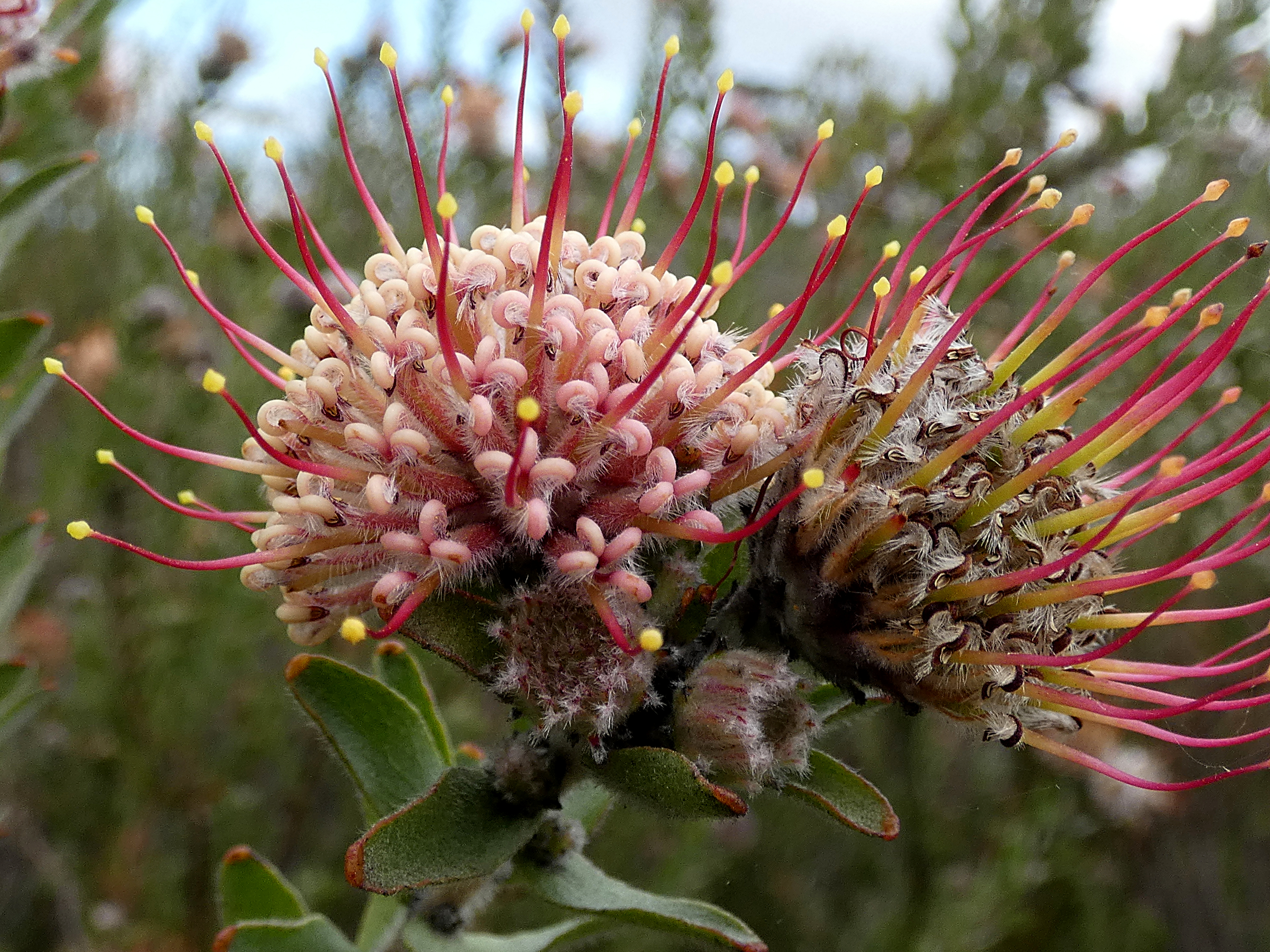

Conservation status
- Least Concern (IUCN 3.1)

Scientific classification
- Kingdom: Plantae
- Clade: Embryophytes
- Clade: Tracheophytes
- Clade: Angiosperms
- Clade: Eudicots
- Order: Proteales
- Family: Proteaceae
- Genus: Leucospermum
- Species: L. calligerum

Binomial name
- Leucospermum calligerum (Salisb. ex. Knight) Rourke

Synonyms
- Protea puberum L., Leucadendrum puberum, Leucadendron puberum, Leucospermum puberum; Leucadendrum calligerum; Leucadendrum gnaphaliifolium; Leucadendrum xeranthemifolium

= Leucospermum calligerum =

Species of plant native to South Africa

Leucospermum calligerum is a softly hairy shrub, with wand-like branches, entire ovate leaves that have a bony tip of about 25 × 6 mm (1 × ¼ in), and globular heads of 2–3½ cm (0.8–1.4 in) in diameter, with two to six together near the tip of the branches and flowering in turn, that consist of 4-merous flowers, initially cream-colored, later pink, with the petals curled and the styles 2–2½ cm (0.8–1.0 in) long, sticking out like pins from a cushion. It is called arid pincushion or common louse pincushion in English and rooiluisie in Afrikaans. Well-scented flowers can be found from July to January. It naturally occurs in fynbos in the Northern Cape and Western Cape provinces of South Africa.

== Description ==
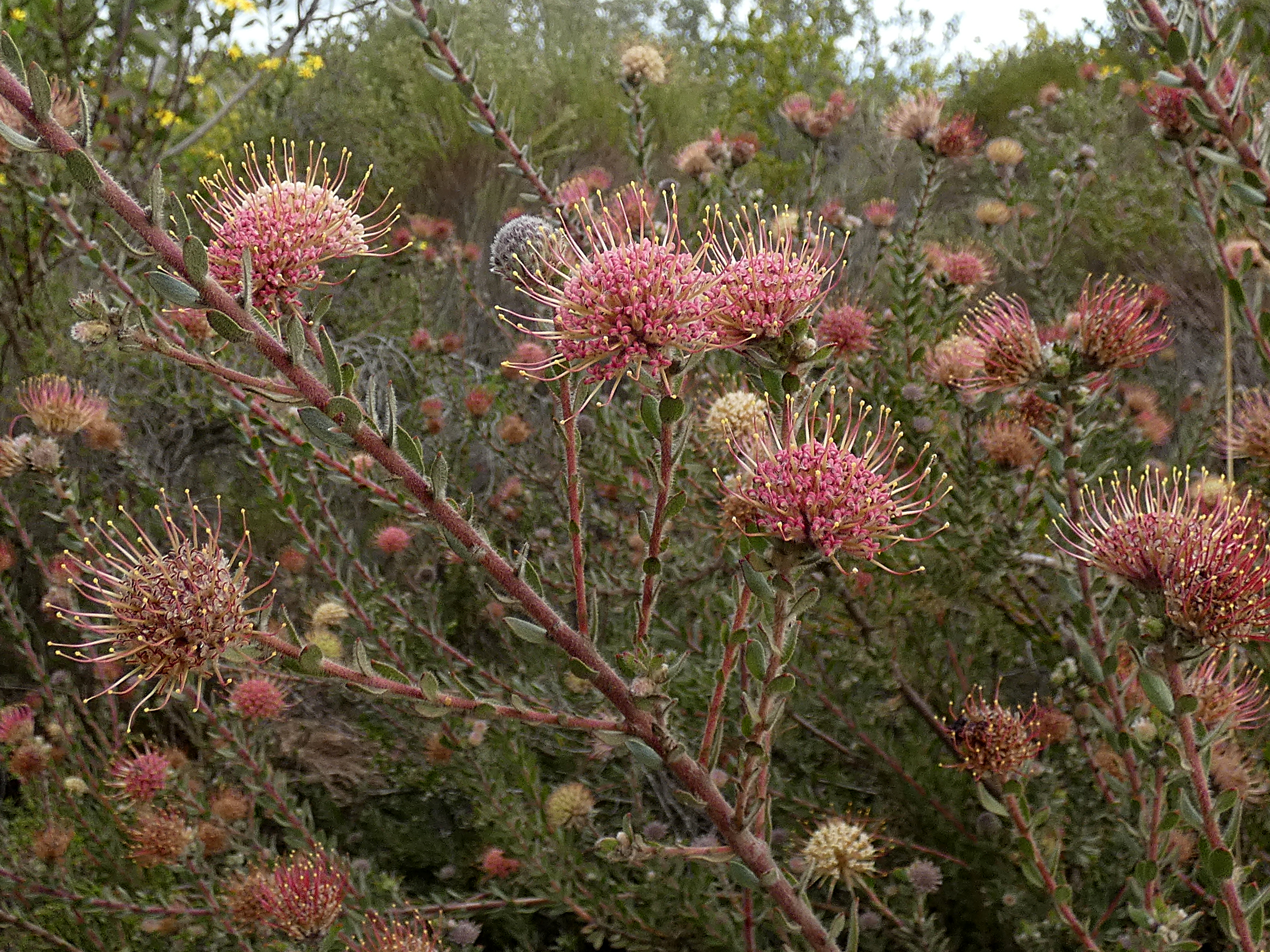
Habit

Leucospermum calligerum is a shrub of ½–2 m (1½–6 ft) high and up to 3 m (9.8 ft) in circumference, with a single main stem at its foot, wand-shaped stems, branching at wide angles, initially horizontal or directly rising up, generally 23–30 centimetres (0.75–0.98 ft) long, 3–5 mm (0.12–0.20 in) thick when flowering, covered in minute soft crinkly hairs and also with longer soft straight or curvy hairs. Its simple, tough, leathery, grey to olive-colored, oval to long-oval leaves are set alternately, overlapping or more scattered along the branches, and have a blunt or pointy thickened tip, sometimes with two or three very small teeth, with a rounded or narrowing base, 1.8–3.2 cm (0.71–1.26 in) long, and 4¼–8½ mm (0.17–0.33 in) wide, often with distinct veins, greyish due to minute soft crinkly hairs and sometimes with longer soft straight or bend hairs, often felty when young.

The hemisphere-shaped flower heads are nearly seated or sit on a stalk of up to 3 cm (1.2 in) long, mostly with two to six together, rarely individually, near the end of the branches. Older clusters of flower heads can be overtopped by young growth and then appear to be placed along a branch. Each flower head of 2–3½ cm (0.8–1.4 in) in diameter, is subtended by an initially cup-shaped involucre of narrow, strongly overlapping, woolly, rubbery (or cartilaginous) bracts of 5 mm–7 mm × 2 mm–3 mm (0.197 in–0.276 in × 0.079 in–0.118 in) with a pointy tip with tufts of long, fine hairs. The individual flower bud is a straight, pale green, 1½–1¾ cm (0.60–0.67 in) long tube, brown opposite the anthers, set with long straight silky hairs. When the flower opens, a tube of ½ cm (0.2 in) long remains, while the four lobes curl back when the flower opens, which are initially cream and later get flushed pink. The style is 21–25 mm (0.83-0.98 in) long, is narrower towards the tip and slightly bend towards the center of the flower head, pale at the base and carmine pink towards the tip. The pollen-presenter, a thickening at the tip of the style (comparable with the "head" of the pin), is conical to oval in shape and yellow in colour, about 1 mm (0.04 in) long, initially carrying bright yellow pollen. The stigma is a transverse groove at the very tip of the pollen-presenter. At the base of the ovary are four awl-shaped, so-called hypogynous scales of about 2 mm (0.08 in) long. The fruit is oval, blunt, almost hairless, and ¾ cm (0.3 in) high. The flowers of Leucospermum calligerum are sweetly scented.

The subtribe Proteinae, to which the genus Leucospermum has been assigned, consistently has a basic chromosome number of twelve (2n=24).

=== Differences with related species ===
L. calligerum looks very much like L. wittebergense, known from the Swartberg range and other peaks surrounding the Little Karoo, north-east of the distribution of L. calligerum. L. wittebergense has a style of 12–19 mm (0.47-0.75 in) long and a spindle-shaped pollen-presenter, while L. calligerum has a 21–25 mm (0.83-0.98 in) long style and an ovoid to conical pollen-presenter.

== Taxonomy ==
This species was first described in the Mantissa Plantarum Altera by the famous Swedish naturalist Carl Linnaeus in 1771, who named it Protea pubera. However, he cited Leucadendron oleaefolium (now Leucospermum oleifolium) by Peter Jonas Bergius as a synonym, making P. pubera a superfluous name. In 1809, Joseph Knight published a book titled On the cultivation of the plants belonging to the natural order of Proteeae, that contained an extensive revision of the Proteaceae attributed to Richard Anthony Salisbury. Salisbury assigned four species to his new genus Leucadendrum that are now considered synonymous: L. puberum, L. gnaphaliifolium, L. xeranthemifolium and L. calligerum. It is assumed that Salisbury had based his review on a draft he had been studying of a paper called On the natural order of plants called Proteaceae that Robert Brown was to publish in 1810. Brown however, called the genus Leucospermum and made the new combination Leucospermum puberum. Salisbury's names were ignored by botanists in favour of those that Brown had created, and this was formalised in 1900 when Leucospermum was given priority over Leucadendrum. Otto Kuntze assigned puberum in 1891 to Leucodendron (making a spelling error). In 1969, John Patrick Rourke made the new combination Leucospermum calligerum. L. calligerum is the type species of the section Diastelloidea or louse pincushions.

The species name calligerum means carrying beauty.

== Distribution and habitat ==
L. calligerum is one of the more widely distributed species of Leucospermum and can be found from the Gifberg near Vanrhynsdorp and the Lokenberg south of Nieuwoudtville in the north, to Albertinia in the south east. It grows on hot, dry and well drained sandy flats and steep rocky slopes, mostly weathered Table Mountain sandstone, but also on conglomerates of Cape Granite and Malmesbury Shale, between 15–1,200 m (49–3,937 ft) elevation. They are limited to locations that receive between 25–50 cm (9.8–19.7 in) of rain during the winter and less than 75 cm (30 in) on average per year.

== Ecology ==
The arid pincushion is visited by birds such as the orange-breasted sunbird Anthobaphes violacea and the Cape sugarbird Promerops cafer, and insects such as beetles, bees and flies. Birds are expected to be the most effective pollinators for non-creeping Leucospermum species. Seeds are ripe about two months after flowering. Attached to each seed is a fleshy ant bread, that is attractive to ants. The ants collect the seeds, take them underground to their nests and eat the ant bread (a seed dispersion strategy called myrmecochory). Plants seldom survive the fires that occur naturally in the fynbos every decade or two. When afterwards the rain carries specific chemicals that are created by the fire underground, the seeds germinate and the species is so "resurrected".
