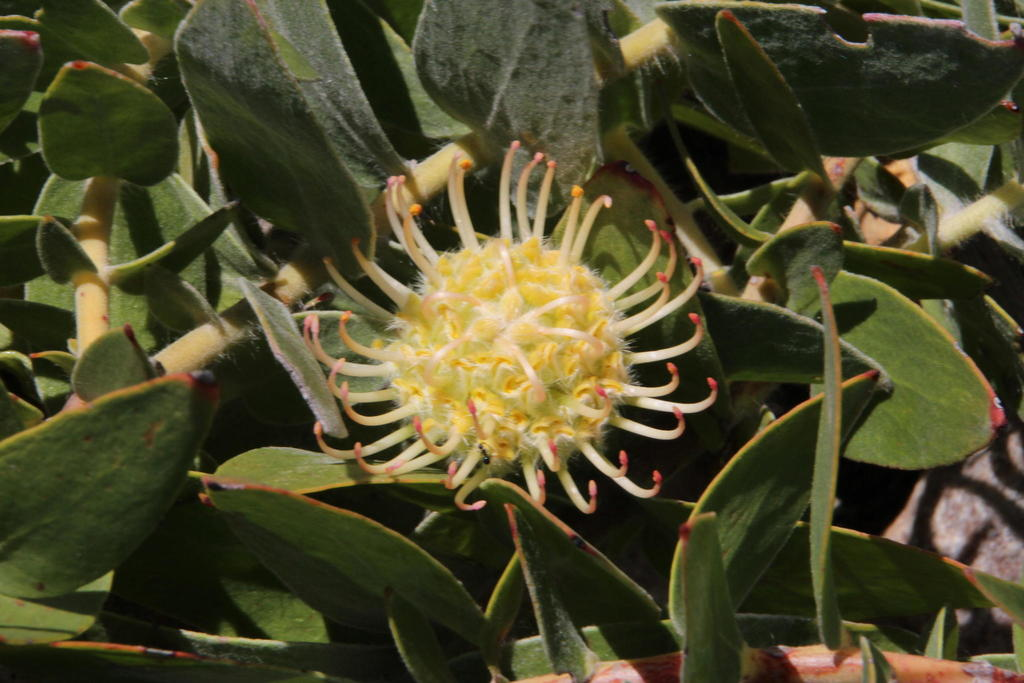

Conservation status
- Endangered (IUCN 3.1)

Scientific classification
- Kingdom: Plantae
- Clade: Embryophytes
- Clade: Tracheophytes
- Clade: Angiosperms
- Clade: Eudicots
- Order: Proteales
- Family: Proteaceae
- Genus: Leucospermum
- Species: L. cordatum

Binomial name
- Leucospermum cordatum E.Phillips

= Leucospermum cordatum =

Species of plant native to South Africa

Leucospermum cordatum is an evergreen, creeping shrublet of about 20 cm (8 in) high from the family Proteaceae. It has pale cream flower heads, from which pink flushed styles emerge, the whole reminiscent of a pincushion. Its common name is heart-leaf pincushion in English. It flowers between July and December but the peak of the flowering period is from September to November. It is an endemic species, that is only known from two locations close to each other in the Western Cape province of South Africa.

== Taxonomy ==
Leucospermum cordatum was first described by Edwin Percy Phillips in 1923. No synonyms are known.

L. cordatum has been assigned to the showy pincushions, section Brevifilamentum.

The species name cordatum is from the Latin and means "heart-shaped"

== Description ==
L. cordatum is a low trailing shrublet of 15–25 cm (6–10 in) high, that eventually forms open mats 1–2 m (3–6 ft) in diameter, that grows from a single trunk at the base of up to 3 cm (1.2 in) in diameter and is covered in a smooth grey bark. The flowering stems are slender, 3–4 mm (0.12–0.16 in) in diameter with some powdery hairs and some long, soft, erect hairs. The leaves are oval in shape with an entire margin without teeth, a pointy tip and a heart-shaped base or even with lobes reaching beyond the attachment of the leaf to the stem, 3–5½ cm (1.2–2.2 in) long and 1–2½ cm (0.4–1.0 in) wide, stiffly standing out, and widely spaced, initially powdery hairy but becoming hairless with age.

The flower heads are globe shaped with a flattened top, 3–4 cm (1.2–1.6 in) in diameter, set on a stalk of 2–5 cm (0.8–2.0 in) long and 2–3 mm (0.08–0.12 in) thick. The common base of the flowers in the same head is low cone-shaped, about 7 mm (0.28 in) in both height and width. The bracts that subtend the flower head are pointy or suddenly pointed, about 5 mm (0.2 in) wide and 7–10 mm (0.28–0.40 in) long, overlapping, rubbery in consistency, softly hairy and with a tightly spaced, regular row of equal length hairs along its margin. The bract subtending the individual flower is egg-shaped, 8–10 mm long and 5–6 mm wide at base and abruptly pointed at the tip, rubbery in consistency and woolly hairy at its base, again with the margins set with a tightly spaced, regular row of equal length hairs. The 4-merous perianth is very small for a Leucospermum, 1½–1¾ cm (0.6–0.7 in) long, pale cream to translucent in colour, strongly curved towards the center of the head in the bud. The lower part, where the lobes remain merged when the flower has opened (called tube) is hairless, cylinder-shaped and about 5 mm (0.2 in) long. The lobes in the middle part (or claws), where the perianth is split, are about half as wide at the tip as at the base, translucent and set with straight, spreading hairs of 2–3 mm (0.08–0.12 in) long, except for the claw facing center of the flower head that is hairless. The upper part, which enclosed the pollen presenter in the bud consists of four ellips-shaped limbs are about 4 mm (0.16 in) long, and 1½ mm (0.06 in) wide felty hairy on the outside. From the perianth emerges a style that is white or flushed with pink, strongly curved towards the center of the head, narrowing near its tip, of 2–2½ cm (0.8–1.0 in) long. The thickened part at the tip of the style called pollen presenter is at a small angle with the style, narrowly cone-shaped with a pointy tip, 2½ mm (0.1 in) long and pink in colour, later bleaching to white. The ovary is subtended by four opaque line-shaped scales of about 3 mm (0.12 in) long. The flowers of Leucospermum cordatum are sweetly scented.

The subtribe Proteinae, to which the genus Leucospermum has been assigned, consistently has a basic chromosome number of twelve (2n=24).

=== Differences with related species ===
The heart-leaf pincushion can be distinguished by its low creeping habit, the entire, oval leaves with a pointy tip and heart-shaped foot acute leaves, the short 2–2½ cm (0.8–1.0 in) long styles that are strongly curved toward the center of the flower head, the cone-shaped pollen presenter that is at a small angle with the style.

== Distribution, habitat and ecology ==
The heart-leaved pincushion is only known from one population in the Kogelberg Mountains of the southwestern Western Cape province of South Africa, about halfway between Rooi Els and Kogel Bay near a former manganese mine, on the steep, lower, west-facing slopes of the Rooi Els Berg, between 15 and 75 m (50–250 ft) altitude. It grows in a vegetation with tufts of Restionaceae on coarse gravel mixed with clay, the result of weathering of Table Mountain Sandstone just above the lower Table Mountain Shaleband. At this location the average annual precipitation is 750–1000 mm (30–40 in), most of which falls during the southern winter.

The flowers are pollinated by mammals.

The species is restricted to a particular vegetation type Kogelberg Sandstone Fynbos, associated with scree that is rich in manganese.

== Conservation ==
The heart-leaf pincushion is an endemic that is restricted to only about 6 km^{2} (2⅓ mi^{2}). The population fluctuates with the periodic occurrence of fires that kill the mature plants. Manganese mining and road construction used to have a negative impact on the population, but these activities have long since ceased. The remaining population is now well protected and the decline seems to have stopped. L. cordatum is considered an endangered species.
