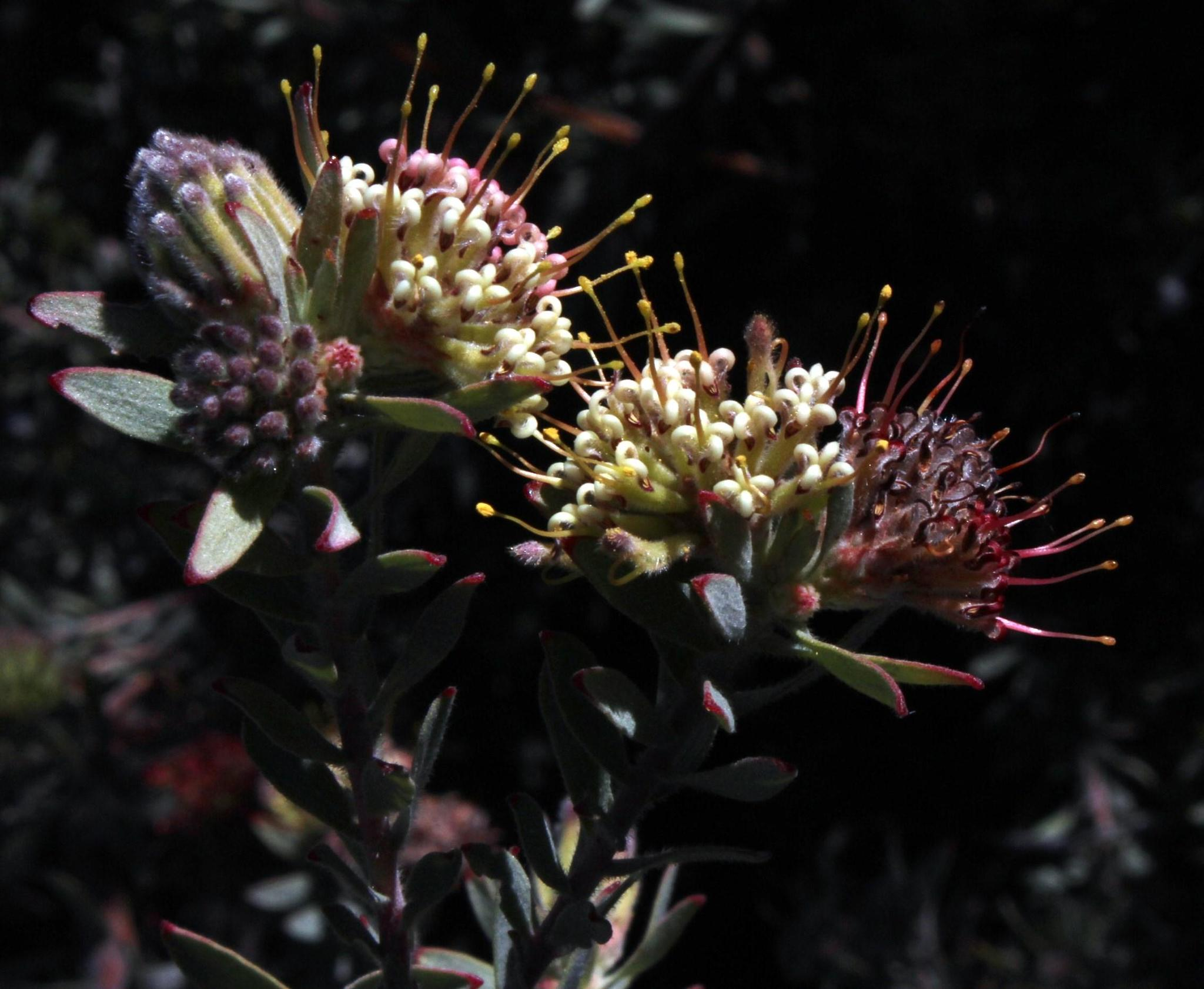

Conservation status
- Least Concern (IUCN 3.1)

Scientific classification
- Kingdom: Plantae
- Clade: Embryophytes
- Clade: Tracheophytes
- Clade: Spermatophytes
- Clade: Angiosperms
- Clade: Eudicots
- Order: Proteales
- Family: Proteaceae
- Genus: Leucospermum
- Species: L. wittebergense

Binomial name
- Leucospermum wittebergense Compton

= Leucospermum wittebergense =

Species of shrub

Leucospermum wittebergense is an evergreen, upright to more or less spreading shrub of 0.5–1.5 m (1.7–5 ft) high and wide from the family Proteaceae. It has globe-shaped flower heads of about 2 cm (0.8 in) in diameter with initially whitish, later pinkish flowers. It has crowded, overlapping, inverted lance-shaped leaves, set at an upward angle and covered in short, dense grey-silvery shaggy hairs. From the center of the perianth emerge almost straight styles that jointly give the impression of a pincushion. It is called Swartberg pincushion in English. The species naturally occurs in the Western Cape province of South Africa. It can be found flowering between August and January.

== Description ==
Leucospermum wittebergense is an upright, richly branching shrub of 0.5–1.5 m (1.7–5 ft) high. The flowering branches are upright, round in cross section, about 3 mm (0.12 in) in diameter, and mostly covered with scars left by fallen leaves. The alternately set, overlapping grey to silvery leaves at an upward angle, ellipse to lance-shaped, 1.5–2.5 cm (0.6–1.0 in) long and 3–6 mm (1.2–2.4 in) wide, covered by fine cringy hairs, and have an entire margin.

The stalkless flower heads are globe-shaped and about 2 cm (0.8 in) in diameter, mostly set individually. The common base of the flowers in the same head is inverted conical shaped with a flattened top and about 4 mm (0.16 in) wide. The bracts that subtend the flower head are closely overlapping, broadly lance-shaped, with a pointy or pointed tip, about 4 mm long and 2 mm wide, covered in dense shaggy hairs, and cartilaginous in consistency.

The bract subtending the individual flower is carmine in colour, inverted lance-shaped with a pointy tip, 6–7 mm (2.4–2.8 in) long, and 1–2 mm (0.04–0.08 in) wide, and densely set with woolly hairs. The 4-merous perianth is initially pale cream, later attaining a pink hue, 1.5 cm (0.6 in) long and straight when in the bud. The lower part with the lobes fused (called tube) is about 3 mm (0.12 in) long, hairless at base but powdery higher up an slightly squared across. The middle part where all four lobes become free when the flower opens (called claws), are about 1 cm (0.4 in) long, pinkish carmine on the outside and creamy yellow on the inside, thickly set with shaggy hair, curl back to its base when the flowers open, and it is difficult to determine where the limbs start. The higher part of the lobes (called limbs) is elliptic in shape, thickly shaggy hairy, and recurved when the flower has opened. The style is 12–19 mm (0.48–0.76 in) long, thread-shaped, straight or very slightly curved and pink to carmine in colour. The slightly thickened tip called pollen presenter is yellow in colour, blunt cone-shaped to somewhat cleft and about 1 mm (0.04 in) long. Subtending the ovary are four opaque, thread-shaped scales of 0.5–0.7 mm (0.020–0.028 in) long. The flowers of Leucospermum wittebergensis are slightly scented.

=== Differences with related species ===
L. wittebergense differs from its closest relatives by the short style of 12–19 mm (0.36–0.76 in) long, the pollen presenter that is cleft in two at the top and blunt cylinder-shaped, and crowded, overlapping leaves, set at an upward angle and covered in short, dense grey-silvery felty hairs.

== Taxonomy ==
As far as known, Johann Franz Drège was the first to collect the Swartberg pincushion in July 1829. Subsequent findings usually were confused with Leucospermum puberum (now L. calligerum). Only in 1933, after Robert Harold Compton realised this was a distinctive species, he described the plant and named it L. wittebergense.

L. wittebergense has been assigned to the louse pincushions, section Diastelloidea.

The species name wittebergense means "of the Witteberg", the location where the first specimen has been collected.

== Distribution, habitat and ecology ==
L. wittebergense occurs from the Witteberg in the west, along the Swartberg, to a few miles east of Meirings Poort. It is also known from the Touwsberg and Warmwaterberg in the Little Karroo and near Oudtshoorn on the northern slopes of the Outeniqua Range at Klein Moeras River. It only grows on arid rocky slopes of Witteberg Quartzite or Table Mountain Sandstone, at an altitude of 750–1850 m (2500–6000 ft), either facing north or south. Arid Fynbos constitutes the associated vegetation. The population on the Swartberg reaches up to 1.5 m (5 ft) high with the average annual precipitation up to 635 mm (25 in), while the plants on the Witteberg are mostly no larger than 0.5 m, but only receive 250 mm (10 in).

The Swartberg pincushion does not survive the periodic wildfires that naturally occur in the fynbos it inhabits. The relatively small flowers are pollinated by bees and flies. When its fruits are ripe about two months after flowering, these fall to the ground. Here they are collected by native ants, that carry them to their underground nests, where they eat the elaiosome. The slick and hard seed that remains cannot be removed, and stays underground until it germinates after a fire and rain.
