= Erica brachialis =

Scientific classification
- Kingdom: Plantae
- Clade: Tracheophytes
- Clade: Angiosperms
- Clade: Eudicots
- Clade: Asterids
- Order: Ericales
- Family: Ericaceae
- Genus: Erica
- Species: E. brachialis

Binomial name
- Erica brachialis Salisb.

Synonyms
- Syringodea brachialis G.Don

Species of flowering plant

Erica brachialis, the hairy-tube heath, is a plant belonging to the genus Erica and forming part of the fynbos. The species is endemic to the Western Cape and occurs on the Cape Peninsula and also from Rooiels to Hangklip. There are currently only 1 200 plants in six subpopulations. The plant's habitat is threatened by coastal development, veld fires and invasive plants.
