= Streptomyces fractus =

Scientific classification
- Domain: Bacteria
- Kingdom: Bacillati
- Phylum: Actinomycetota
- Class: Actinomycetia
- Order: Streptomycetales
- Family: Streptomycetaceae
- Genus: Streptomyces
- Species: S. fractus

Binomial name
- Streptomyces fractus Rohland and Meyers et al. 2016

Type strain
- DSM 42163, NRRL B-59159, MV32

Species of bacterium

Streptomyces fractus is a bacterium species from the genus of Streptomyces which has been isolated from the termite Amitermes hastatus from the Tygerberg Nature Reserve in South Africa.

== See also ==
- List of Streptomyces species
