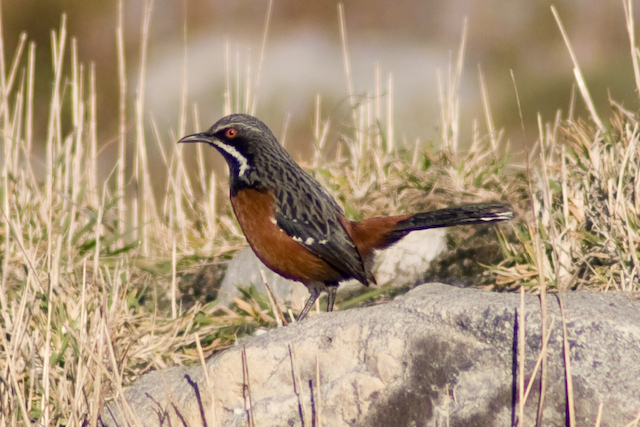

Conservation status
- Near Threatened (IUCN 3.1)

Scientific classification
- Kingdom: Animalia
- Phylum: Chordata
- Class: Aves
- Order: Passeriformes
- Family: Chaetopidae
- Genus: Chaetops
- Species: C. frenatus

Binomial name
- Chaetops frenatus (Temminck, 1826)

= Cape rockjumper =

Species of bird

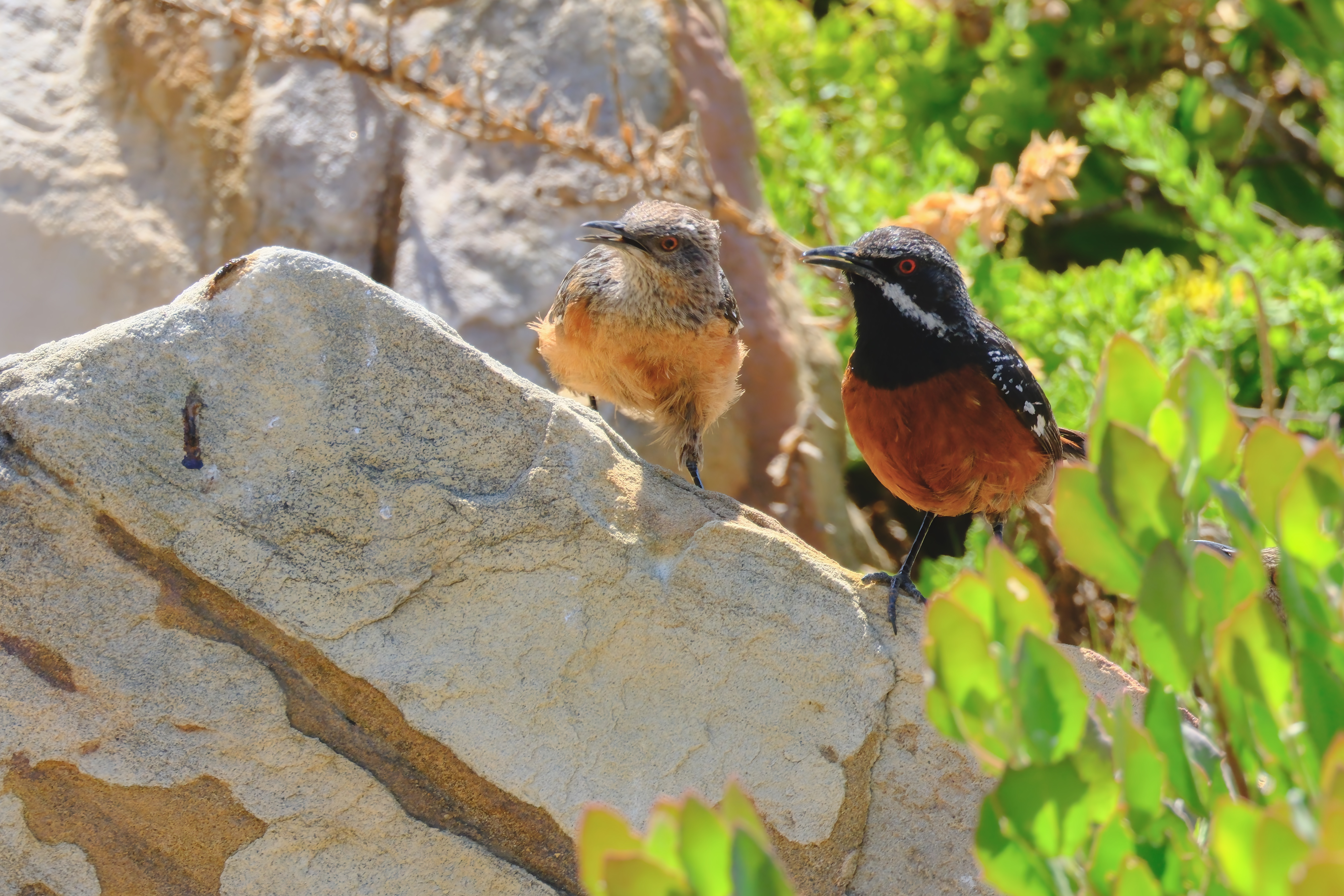
Cape rockjumpers, male with chick, Rooiels, South Africa

The Cape rockjumper or rufous rockjumper (Chaetops frenatus) is a medium-sized insectivorous passerine bird endemic to the mountain Fynbos of southernmost South Africa.

== Taxonomy ==
The Cape and Drakensberg rockjumpers were split into separate species in the 1980s. The Latin epithet frenatus refers to the "bridled" or black-and-white head pattern. When the Drakensberg rockjumper was split it was given the Latin aurantius meaning 'orange'. Initial taxonomy placed rockjumpers in the thrush family Turdidae in 1867. They were then moved to the babblers Timaliidae in the 1980s, before genetic work in the 1990s placed them in their own family Chaetopidae. See the main page on the rockjumper for more details.

Some authorities (notably Dickinson and Christidis) treat the two rockjumpers as a single species, Chaetops frenatus, with two subspecies. However, for most field guides and birders, and the International Ornithologists' Union and The Clements Checklist of Birds of the World, they are now treated as two separate species.

== Description ==
The Cape rockjumper is 23–25 cm long with a long black tail and strong legs. The male has a dark grey and black head with a thin white supercilium and a broad white moustache (malar stripe). The back and wings are dark grey, and the underparts and rump are rufous red. The female and juvenile have a paler grey head, upperparts and wings, a duller head pattern, an orange rump, and buff underparts. The call varies from 1-4 piercing whistles to a series of trills. Adults have bright red eyes, while juveniles have black eyes until mature.

The closely related Drakensberg rockjumper (Chaetops aurantius) does not overlap in range. The male of that species has orange underparts, and the female and young are paler below than the Cape rockjumper.

== Behaviour and ecology ==
=== Diet ===
Birds forage on rocky slopes and scree. Insects are the major part of the diet, although small vertebrates are reported to be taken by Cape rockjumpers. A range of insects are taken, including caterpillars, moths, grasshoppers, beetles and flies. In addition to insects other prey include lizards and geckos, amphibians, scorpions, annelid worms and spiders. Their wings are proportionately small and they do not fly very often, although they will often take long gliding "flights" across valleys or downslope. They spend most of their lives running and jumping among rocks and grasses while hunting arthropods, small lizards, and amphibians.

=== Breeding ===
Family group territories near Cape Town vary in size from 4–11 ha (10–27 acres), but are larger out east. Typically these grounds consist of a breeding pair and one or two additional individuals, usually offspring from the preceding breeding season. These helpers participate in territorial defence and alarm calling, and in the feeding of nestlings and fledglings of the breeding pair. Both sexes help with nest building and incubation.

While an initial study from 2002 found Cape rockjumpers attempt only one nest per season, a more recent study found they will attempt up to 5 nests per season if initial nests fail, and even re-nesting when they have had a successful nest.

Nests are built on the ground under rocky overhangs, and lined with either fur from red rock hares or old and fluffy protea seed pods. In general, nests are built under rocks on the downward facing slope to provide protection in inclement weather.

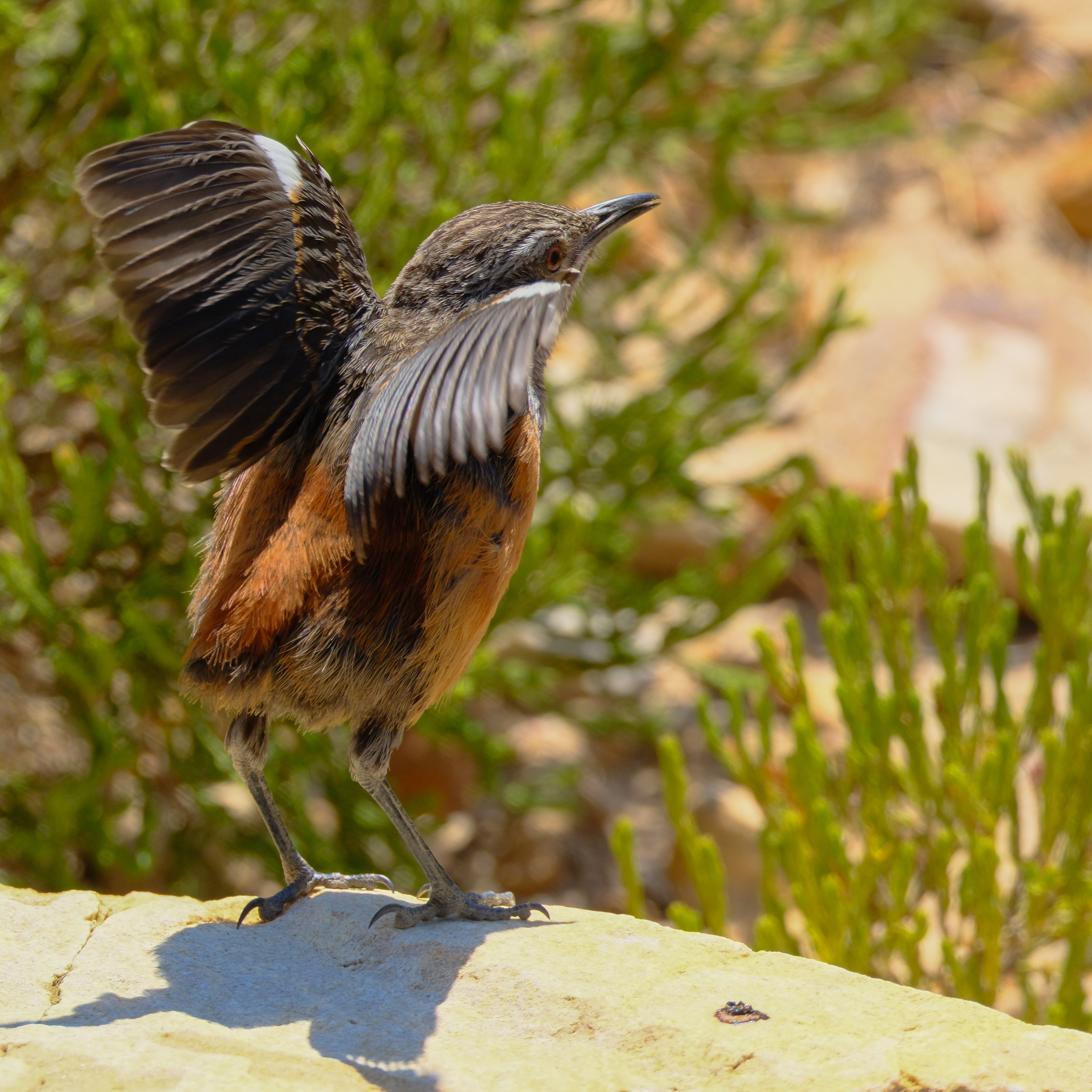
Cape rockjumper chick spreading its wings

As ground nesters, rockjumpers face high levels of predation. Cape rockjumper nest predation comes predominantly from the Boomslang, with this predation increasing at higher temperatures. They also experience predation from Cape grey mongoose, honey badger, common egg-eater, and African vlei rat. While parents can deter mongoose by harassing them, this is generally not successful to deter snakes. Although not recorded, it is also likely they experience predation from chacma baboon, black-backed jackal, white-necked raven, and other snakes in the area (such as Cape cobra or puff adder).

Nest success for Cape rockjumpers is higher in territories that had more recent fire (within 3–5 years), possibly as there were fewer predators present.

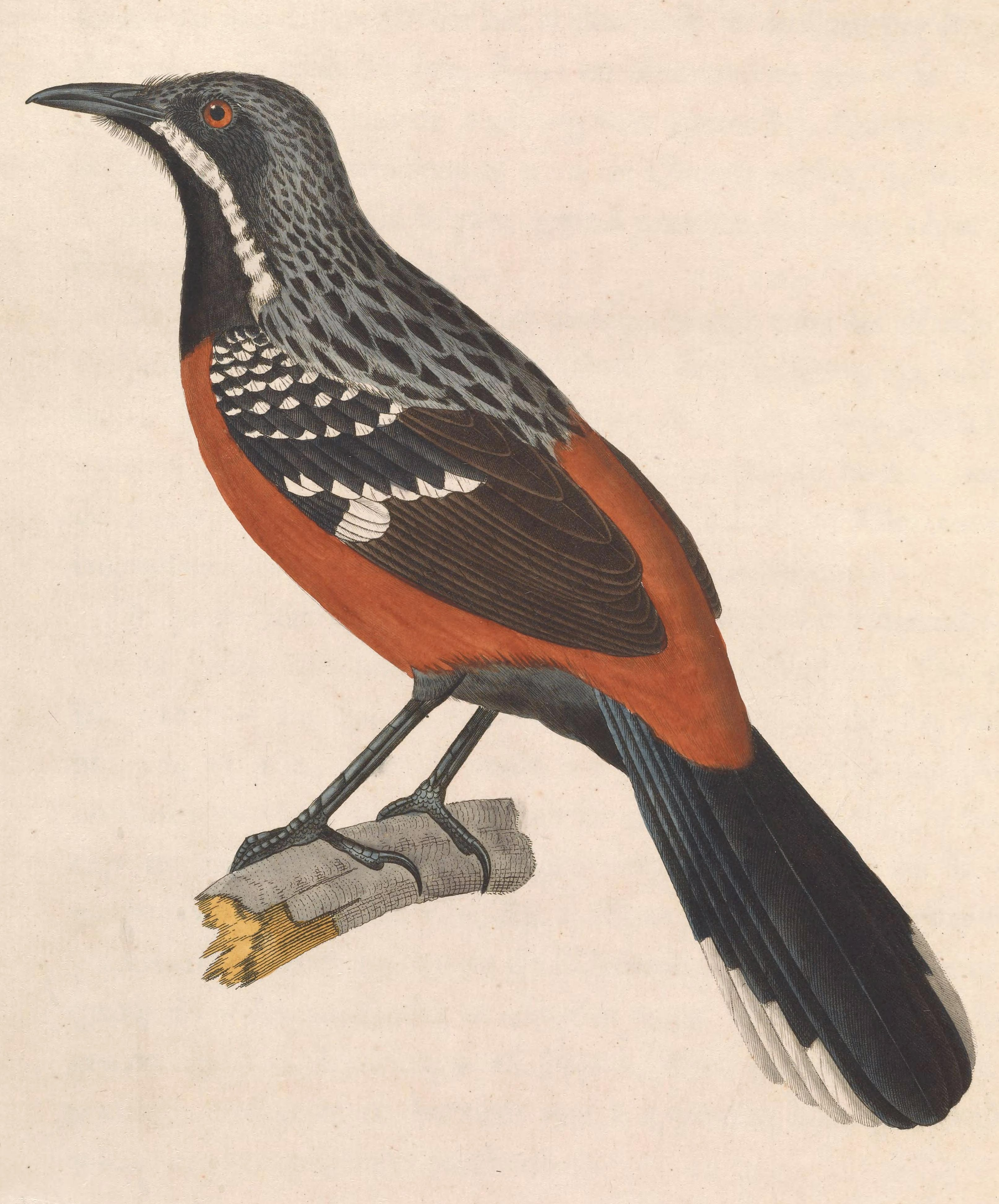
Illustration from the 1838 description.

=== Habitat ===
Cape rockjumpers inhabit only mountain Fynbos, specifically that dominated by low scrubby restio vegetation. They prefer steep slopes with plenty of large boulders from which they can perch to keep an eye out for predators. While there is an established population at sea level at Rooi-Els (~ 80 km east of Cape Town), this area nevertheless is made up of mountain Fynbos habitat.

=== Climate sensitivity ===
Cape rockjumpers exist only in Alpine Fynbos, a specialised habitat of 90,000 ha from Cape Town to Port Elizabeth in South Africa. These birds are alpine habitat specialists, and so used to a very specific range of temperatures. Cape rockjumper numbers are declining in warmer parts of their habitat, and birds were found to have low heat tolerance compared to other birds of the Fynbos. Juvenile Cape rockjumpers are more sensitive to the heat than adults, and perhaps cannot drink enough water to make up for the water they lose in trying to stay cool when it is hot.

Higher temperatures correlate with increased nest mortality in Cape rockjumpers, as well as increased snake predation.

Birds also struggle to continue foraging when it is hot, and produce smaller offspring at higher temperatures.
