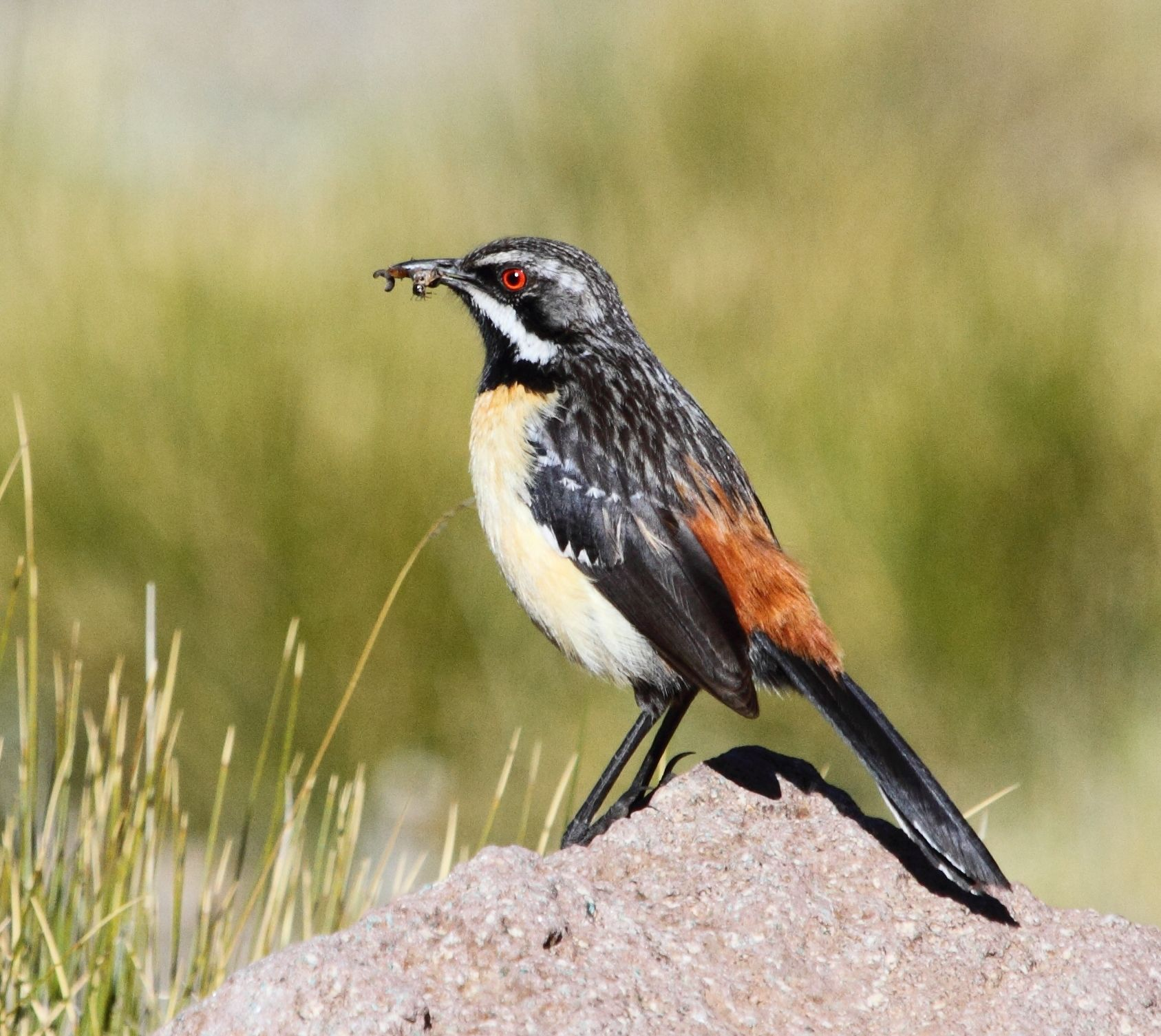
- Male

Conservation status
- Near Threatened (IUCN 3.1)

Scientific classification
- Kingdom: Animalia
- Phylum: Chordata
- Class: Aves
- Order: Passeriformes
- Family: Chaetopidae
- Genus: Chaetops
- Species: C. aurantius

Binomial name
- Chaetops aurantius Layard, 1867
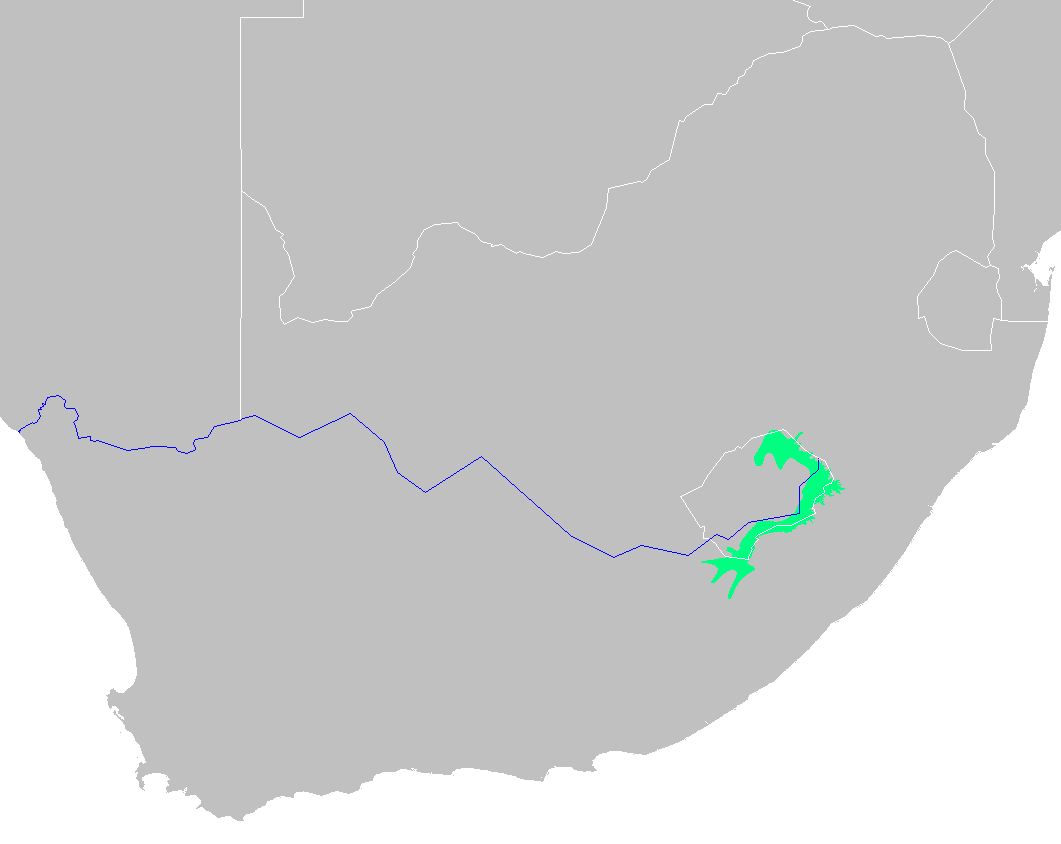
- General range: the Drakensberg alti-montane grasslands

= Drakensberg rockjumper =

Species of bird

The Drakensberg rockjumper or orange-breasted rockjumper (Chaetops aurantius) is a medium-sized insectivorous passerine bird endemic to the alpine grasslands and rock outcrops of the Drakensberg Mountains of southeastern South Africa and Lesotho. This taxon is closely related to the allopatric Cape rockjumper Chaetops frenatus; the two species of Chaetops are the only living members of the Chaetopidae (rockjumper family).

This rockjumper is 23–25 cm long with a long black tail and strong legs. The male has a dark grey head with a thin white supercilium and a broad white moustache. The back and wings are dark grey. The underparts are orange and the rump is rufous red. The female and juvenile have a paler grey head, upperparts and wings, a duller head pattern, an orange rump, and buff underparts. The call is a loud wheeoo. The Cape rockjumper male has rufous red underparts, and the female and young are darker buff below than in C. aurantius.

This is a ground-nesting species which forages on rocky slopes and scree. It frequently perches on rocks. Breeding is often cooperative; one or two additional individuals, usually a pair's offspring of the preceding breeding season, may assist the parents in territorial defence and alarm calling, and in the feeding of nestlings and fledglings.

== Taxonomy ==
Chaetops aurantius was described in 1867 by Edgar Leopold Layard in his book The birds of South Africa. He placed the genus Chaetops in the thrush family. However, DNA studies have shown that the rockjumpers are not closely related to the thrushes – they are possibly basal passerida, and appear to be related to the rail-babbler and the rockfowl.

Some authorities (notably Dickinson and Christidis) treat the two rockjumpers as a single species, Chaetops frenatus, with two subspecies.

== Gallery ==
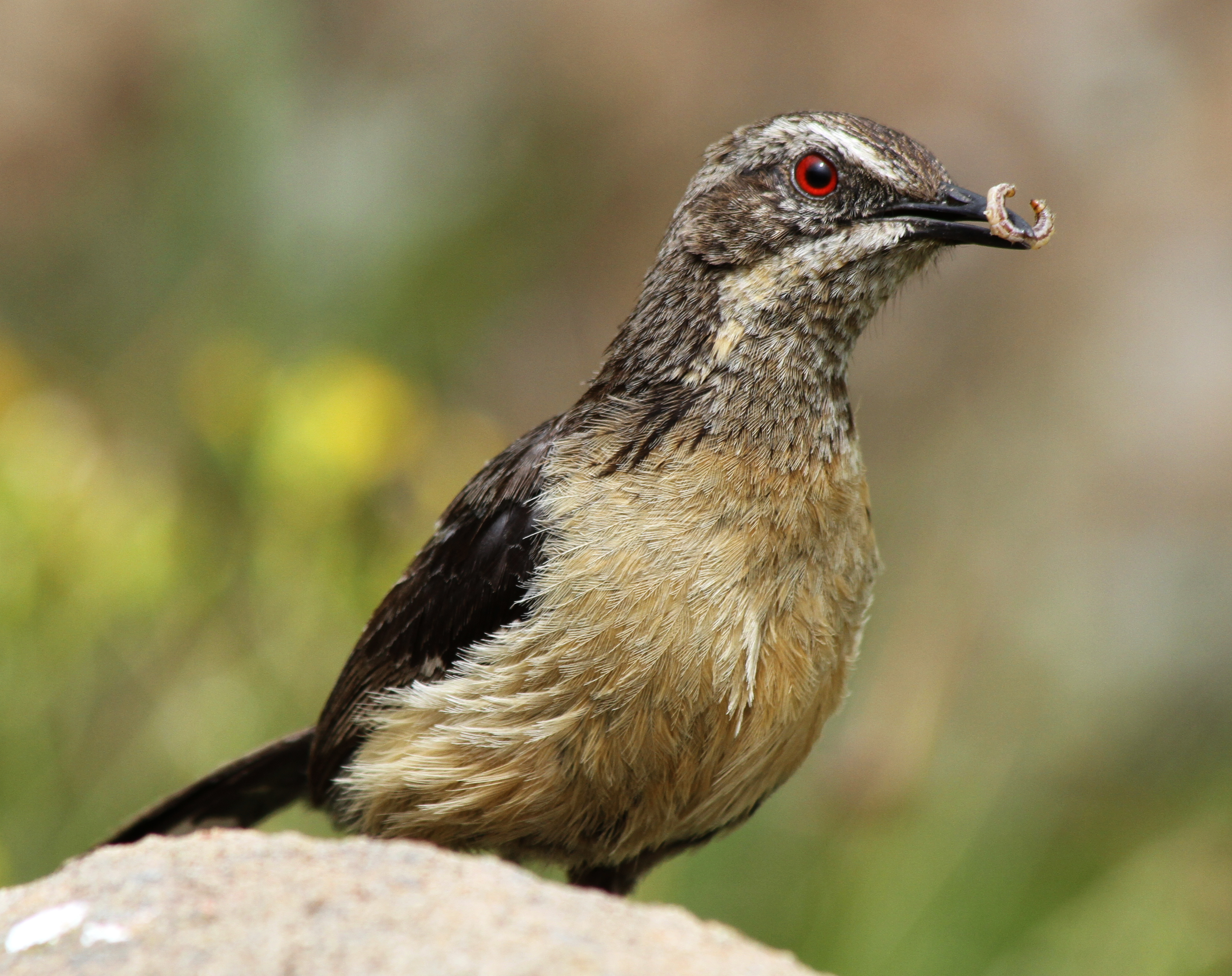
A female with a caterpillar

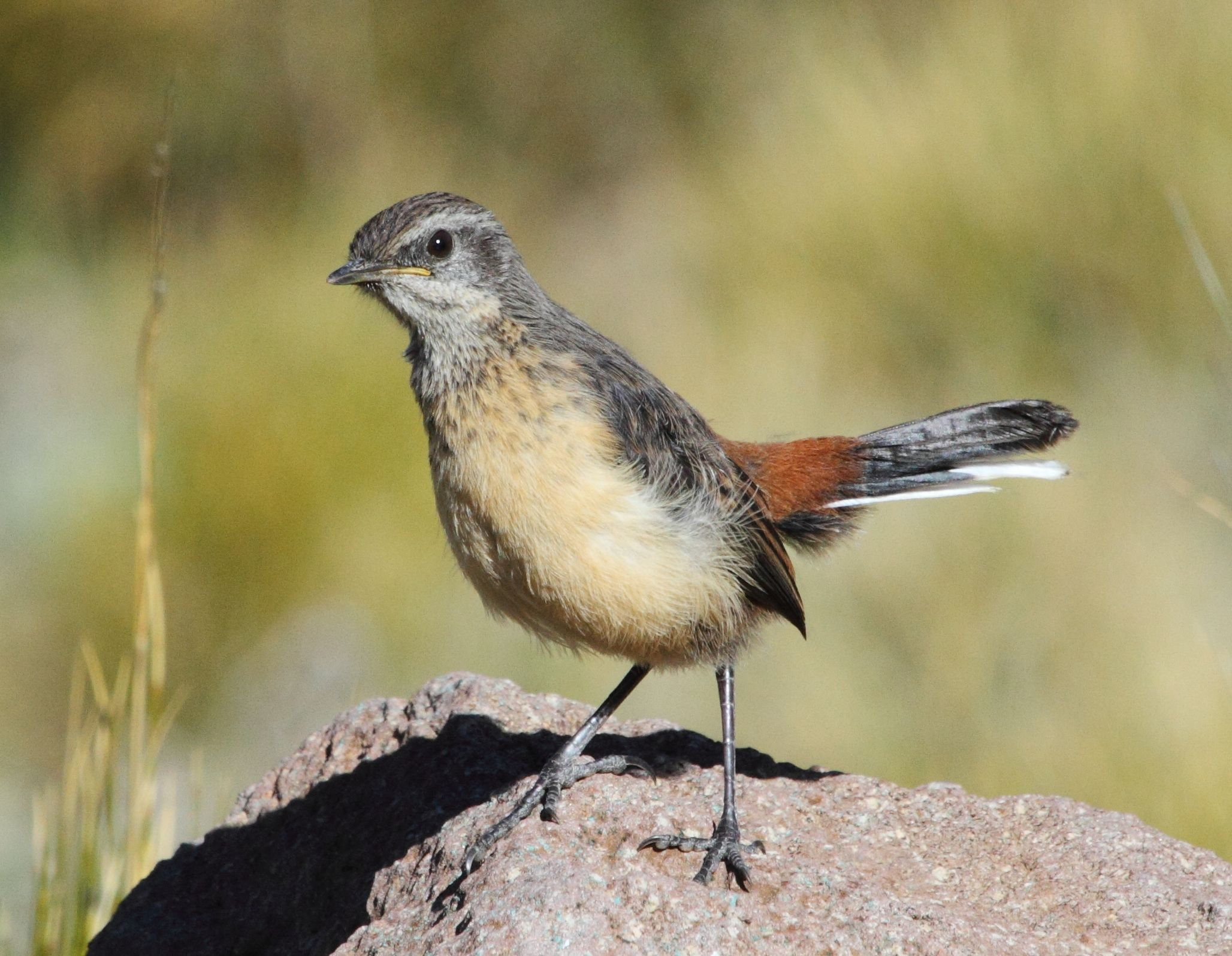
An immature Drakensberg rockjumper

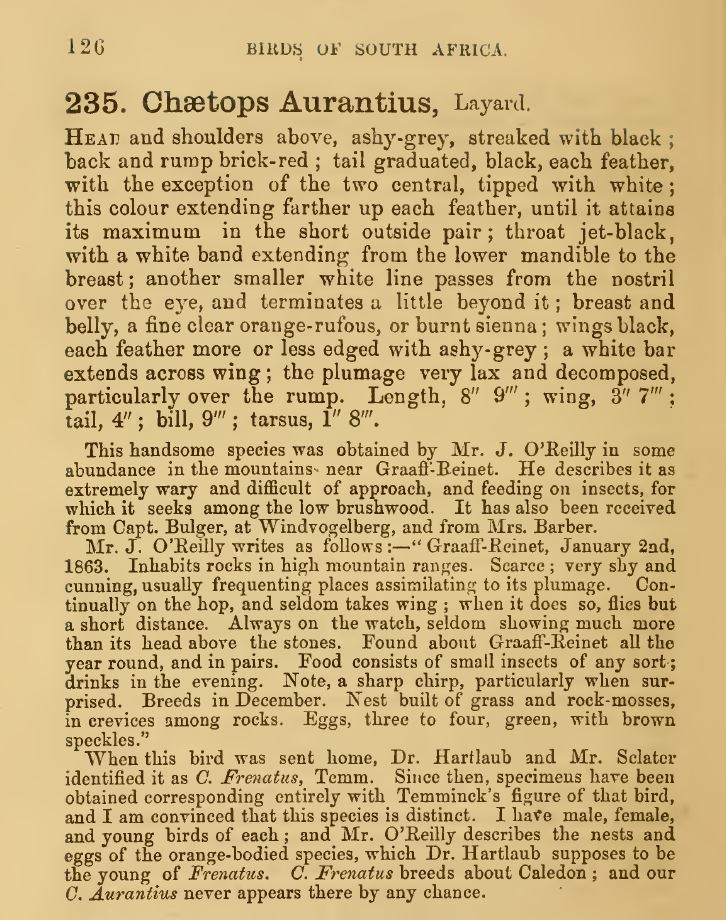
A copy of the original description by Layard.
