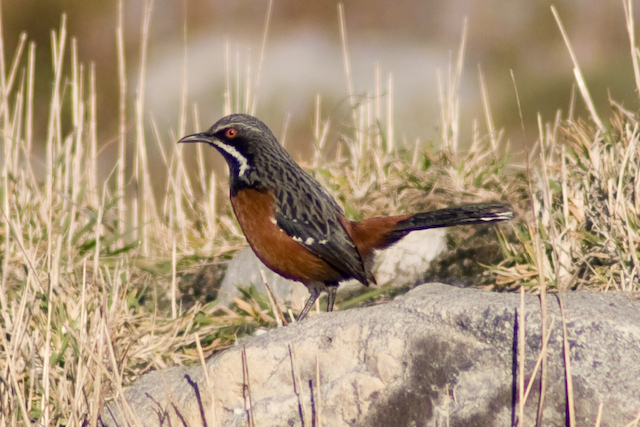
- Cape rockjumper (Chaetops frenatus)

Scientific classification
- Kingdom: Animalia
- Phylum: Chordata
- Class: Aves
- Order: Passeriformes
- Infraorder: Passerides
- Family: Chaetopidae; Fjeldsa, Ericson, Johannson, & Zuccon, 2015
- Genus: Chaetops; Swainson, 1832

Species
- Chaetops frenatus Chaetops aurantius

= Rockjumper =

Rockjumpers

Genus of birds

The rockjumpers are medium-sized insectivorous or omnivorous birds in the genus Chaetops, which constitutes the entire family Chaetopidae. The two species, the Cape rockjumper, Chaetops frenatus, and the Drakensberg rockjumper, Chaetops aurantius, are endemic residents of southern Africa. The Cape rockjumper is a resident of the West Cape and southwestern East Cape, and the Drakensberg (or orange-breasted) rockjumper is distributed in the Lesotho Highlands and areas surrounding them in South Africa. The two rockjumpers were formerly considered as subspecies of one species, but are now treated as two separate species as they differ in size and plumage. The ranges do not overlap, being separated by about 100–150 km.

== Taxonomy and systematics ==
Originally, these birds were placed in the thrushes, and they have also been placed with the Old World warblers and the babblers, but recent DNA studies indicate these birds are actually members of a basal group of oscines within the infraorder Passeri along with their sister-family the rockfowl (Picatharthidae),

Their Latin names derive from descriptions of their appearance; "frenatus" refers to the "bridled" or black-and-white head pattern, while "aurantius" refers to the orange colour.

== Description ==
These are small birds with mostly black, white, and red plumage. Both species have long, white-tipped black tails, black throats, broad white submoustachial lines and eyebrows, rufous or orange bellies and rumps, and grey and black patterned backs and wings. Females have a similar pattern to males, but duller. The iris is red and the bills and legs are black. Their wings are very small and they do not fly very often. They spend most of their lives running and jumping among rocks and grass while hunting insects.

== Behaviour and ecology ==
=== Diet and feeding ===
The rockjumpers feed in groups, foraging on the ground. The groups can number up to six birds (for Cape) and twelve birds (for Drakensberg), but the groups may also spread out quite widely during feeding. Insects are the major part of the diet, although small vertebrates are reported to be taken by Cape rockjumpers. A range of insects are taken, including caterpillars, moths, grasshoppers, beetles and flies. In addition to insects other prey include lizards and geckos, amphibians, scorpions, annelid worms and spiders.

=== Breeding ===
They are monogamous and pairs establish territories which are defended year round. In the Cape rockjumper, the territories vary in size from 4–11 ha (10–27 acres). Both species employ helpers, usually the young of previous broods, to aid the breeding pair in raising the young. Nests are built out of grass on the ground (in contrast to rockfowl, which build mud nests in colonies). The clutch size is two eggs for the Cape rockjumper and two or three eggs for the Drakensberg rockjumper. Both sexes incubate the clutch for 19–21 days. The chicks fledge at 19–21 days, although they are fed by the parents and helpers for up to 4 weeks following fledging.
