= Soetendalsvlei =

Lake in South Africa

- Location within Western Cape
- Location: Western Cape, South Africa
- Coordinates: 34.718079°S 19.980412°E
- Primary inflows: New Year River, Kars River
- Primary outflows: Heuningnes River
- Catchment area: 1,400 km^{2} (540 sq mi)
- Basin countries: South Africa
- Max. length: 8 km (5.0 mi)
- Max. width: 3 km (1.9 mi)
- Settlements: Bredasdorp

Soetendalsvlei is a natural freshwater lake in the Agulhas Plains in the Western Cape province of South Africa. It is the southernmost lake of the African continent and South Africa's second-largest freshwater lake after Lake Chrissie. The lake, situated in a landscape called strandveld, home to a particular type of fynbos vegetation, is a prominent twitchers' area. The lake gets its name from the Zoetendaal, a Dutch East India Company ship, wrecked on the coast near Cape Agulhas on 23 August 1673. It is the oldest shipwreck of the South African coast. The survivors started walking towards the Cape and reached a large, unknown freshwater lake about three hours later. They named the lake out of relief and gratitude after their ship.
