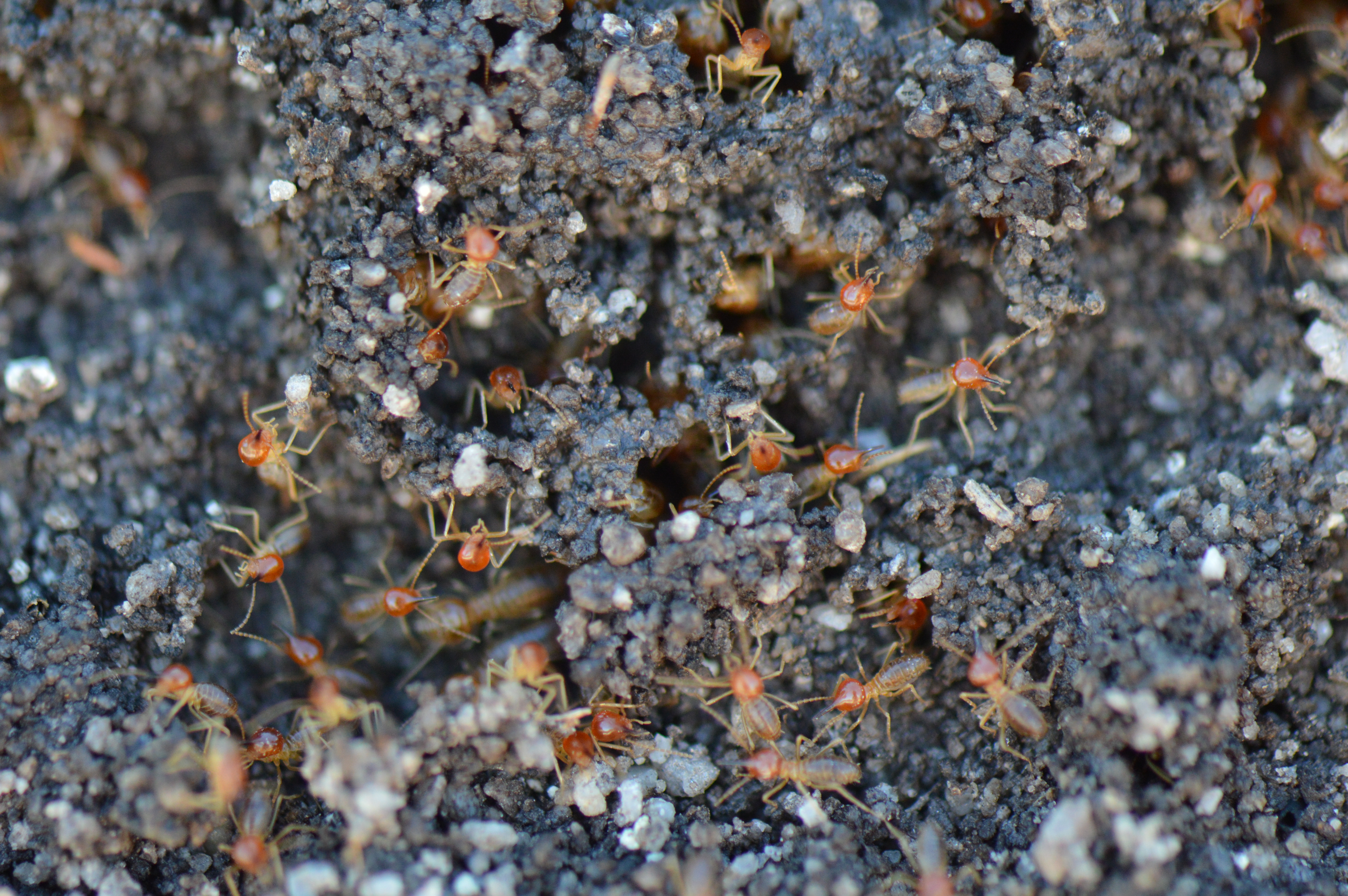
- Amitermes hastatus (black mound termites) from the Western Cape region of South Africa repairing a section of their distinctive black mound. Most of the termites are soldiers

Scientific classification
- Kingdom: Animalia
- Phylum: Arthropoda
- Clade: Pancrustacea
- Class: Insecta
- Order: Blattodea
- Infraorder: Isoptera
- Family: Termitidae
- Genus: Amitermes
- Species: A. hastatus

Binomial name
- Amitermes hastatus (Haviland, 1898)

Synonyms
- Amitermes atlanticus Fuller, 1922

= Amitermes hastatus =

Species of termite endemic to Fynbos in the Western Cape of South Africa

Amitermes hastatus, commonly known as the black mound termite, is a species of termite found in the Western Cape region of South Africa. It is endemic to the region's fynbos ecosystem. They build distinctive black termite mounds that range in height from a few centimeters to 50 centimeters. The species is commonly found on sandy soil eroded from white Table Mountain sandstone at altitudes from just under 100 meters up to 900 meters above sea level.

== Colony ==
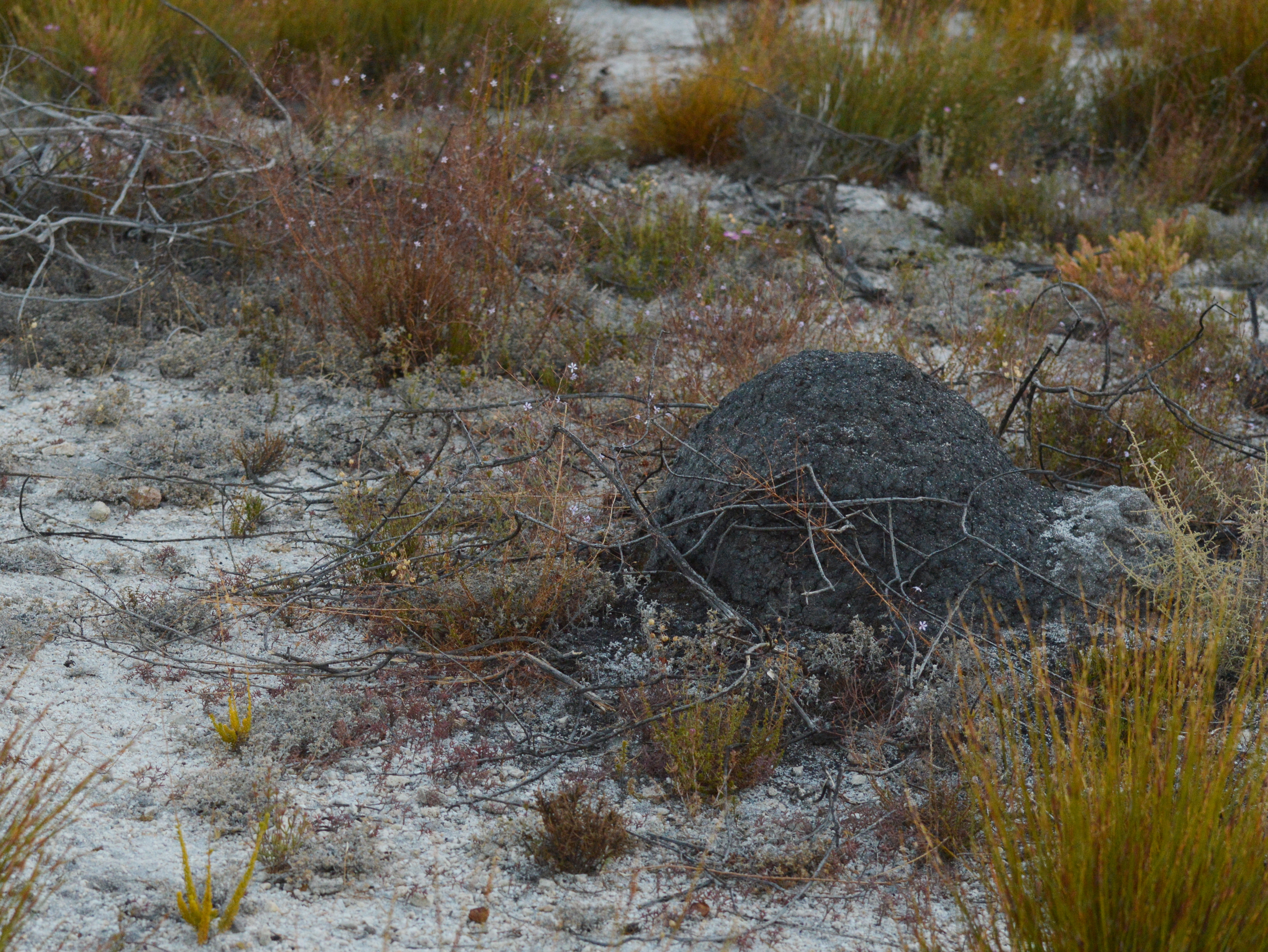
An Amitermes hastatus termite mound measuring about 15cm in height. Note the contrast between the white sand that is typical of the regions of the Western Cape where the termite is found and the distinctive black mound of the termite.

The mound is constructed from white sand and organic matter and is distinctively black in colour due to the cement excreted by the termites. The exterior consists of irregular chambers that are interconnected with other cells through small circular openings. The interior of the mound has larger chambers with thinner walls. There is no royal cell in the mound; instead, breading termites move freely though the network of cells at the centre of the mound. The species is not a fungus grower and as such there are no fungus gardens in the mound. The mounds tend to be as high as they are wide and can reach up to 50 centimeters in height and width.

Workers expand the size of the mound from the mound's interior by making small holes in the mound surface from inside and pushing the building material up from the interior.

== Description ==
Workers range in size from 4mm to 4.5mm in length and have relatively large white heads. Workers can live relatively long lives exceeding nine months. They mostly harvest humus and dead damp organic plant matter for consumption whilst underground, rarely foraging for food on the surface.

Soldiers are larger than workers, ranging in size from 5mm to 5.5mm in length, and they have larger heads that are yellow or red in colour. A large part of the head is taken up by a frontal gland that excretes a colourless, sticky fluid that has a strong irritant effect on other insects. There tends to be one soldier for every twenty to thirty workers. Soldiers rely on workers to feed them.

White nymphs are found in mature mounds older than two or three years old in February and March, and emerge as sexually reproductive alates to undergo mating flights in April or May after the first autumn rains. Queens can reach a length of 15mm and freely move about the centre of the mound. Each mound has multiple kings and queens with up to thirty-five queens in a mound.

== Ecology ==
The parasites of Amitermes hastatus include two species of mites, Termitacarus cuneiformis and Cosmoglyphus kramerii. Another species of termite, Termes winifredae, often cohabits in very close proximity to A. hastatus as an inquiline. T. winifredae numbers tend to be small in number and pose little threat to A. hastatus, with the two species rarely mixing even though their tunnels and chambers might run parallel to each other. Should one of the two species break into the other's colony, they will fight, with A. hastatus tending to beat back T. winifredae. A species of springtail is also known to be a common inhabit of A. hastatus nests, and larvae of the fly Termitometopia skaifei are found in some nests.

Larger animals such as aardvarks and lizards such as southern rock agamas are known to eat various termite species, including A. hastatus.
