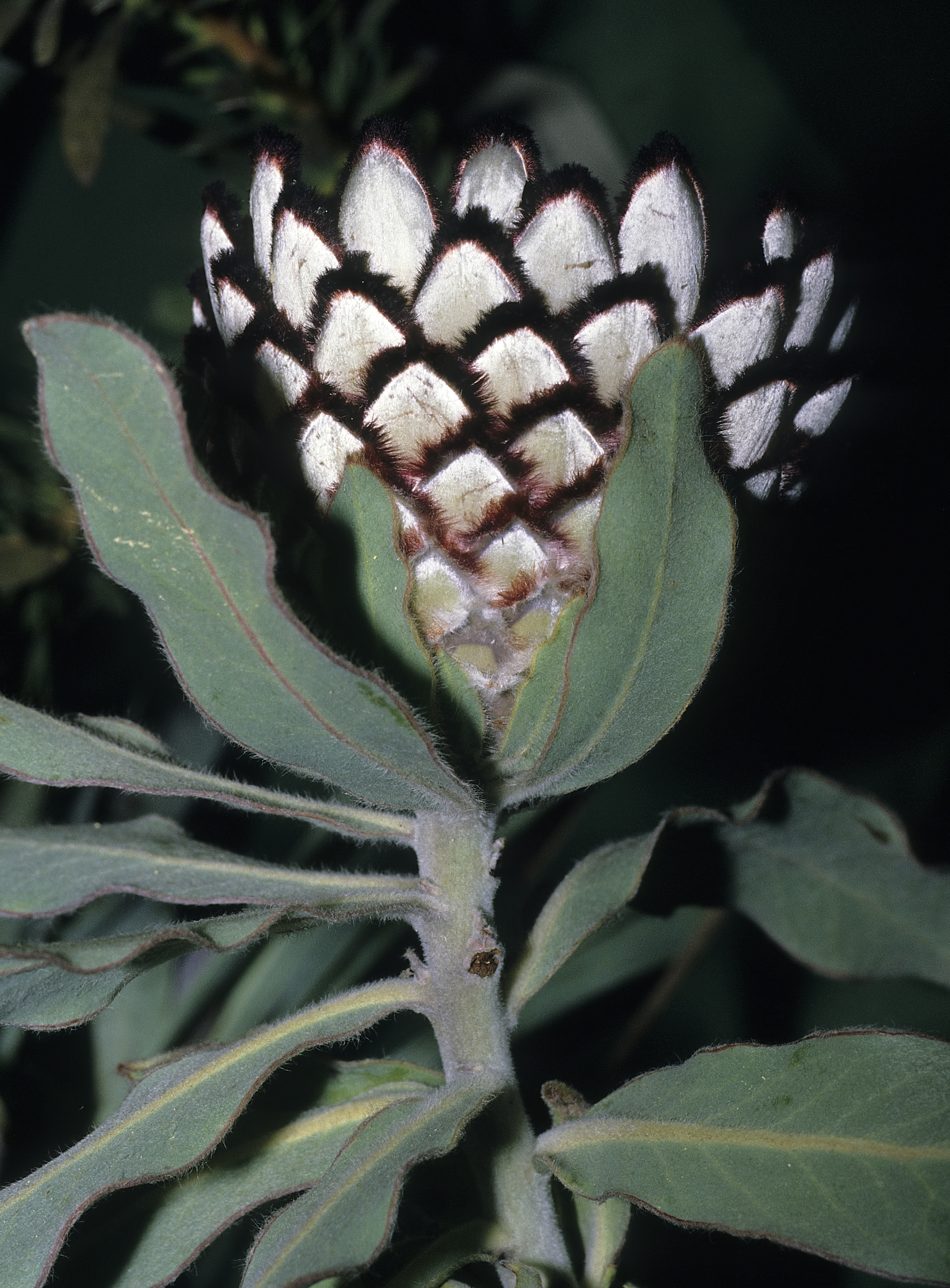
- Protea holosericea inflorescence at the Kirstenbosch National Botanical Garden

Conservation status
- Critically Endangered (IUCN 3.1)

Scientific classification
- Kingdom: Plantae
- Clade: Embryophytes
- Clade: Tracheophytes
- Clade: Angiosperms
- Clade: Eudicots
- Order: Proteales
- Family: Proteaceae
- Genus: Protea
- Species: P. holosericea

Binomial name
- Protea holosericea (Salisb. ex Knight) Rourke

= Protea holosericea =

Sawedge sugarbush

Species of flowering plant

Protea holosericea, commonly known as the Sawedge Sugarbush, is a flowering shrub belonging to the Protea genus. The plant is endemic to South Africa and is found only on Sawedge Peak and Rabiesberg, two adjacent peaks in the Kwadousberg Mountains in the Western Cape.

The shrub has an erect to sprawling habit, grows up to 1.2 metres (3 ft 11 in) high, and blooms from September to October. Possible wildfires can destroy the mature plants, but the seeds will survive such an event. The seeds are stored in the flowerheads, released after fires and spread by the wind. The plant is monoecious with both sexes in each flower. Pollination occurs through the action of birds. The plant grows on the dry, upper mountain slopes at altitudes of 1,200 to 1,300 metres (3,900 to 4,300 ft).

People who picked the plant's flowers caused the plant to almost die out in the 1970s.
