= Rooiels, South Africa =

Rooiels Rooiels
- Location within Western Cape Location within South Africa
- Coordinates: 34°18′05″S 18°48′59″E
- Country: South Africa
- Province: Western Cape
- District: Overberg
- Municipality: Overstrand

Area
  - Total: 1.15 km^{2} (0.44 sq mi)

Population (2011)
  - Total: 125
  - Density: 109/km^{2} (282/sq mi)

Racial makeup (2011)
  - Black African: 1.6%
  - White: 92.0%
  - Other: 6.4%

First languages (2011)
  - English: 48.8%
  - Afrikaans: 47.2%
  - Other: 4.0%
- Time zone: UTC+2 (SAST)

Rooiels (sometimes incorrectly spelled Rooi-Els or Rooi Els) is a small coastal village about 5 km north of Pringle Bay in South Africa's Western Cape province. It lies within the Kogelberg Biosphere Reserve and is home to a variety of wildlife, including Chacma baboons, which are routinely seen in and around residential areas. The village is known for its low-impact development and emphasis on environmental conservation and coexistence.

The village is a registered conservancy. The town roads are narrow, un-tarred and without street lights. Klein Hangklip peak dominates the village, and is home to a pair of Verreaux's eagles. Other animals that may be observed are African clawless otters, rock hyrax, Cape rockjumper, numerous bird species, small antelope and occasionally caracal and leopard.

Rooiels was declared a township in June 1948, and forms part of the Overberg District Municipality. The village was named after the farm and river of the same name, which in turn were named after the red alder (Cunonia capensis) tree known as rooiels in Afrikaans.

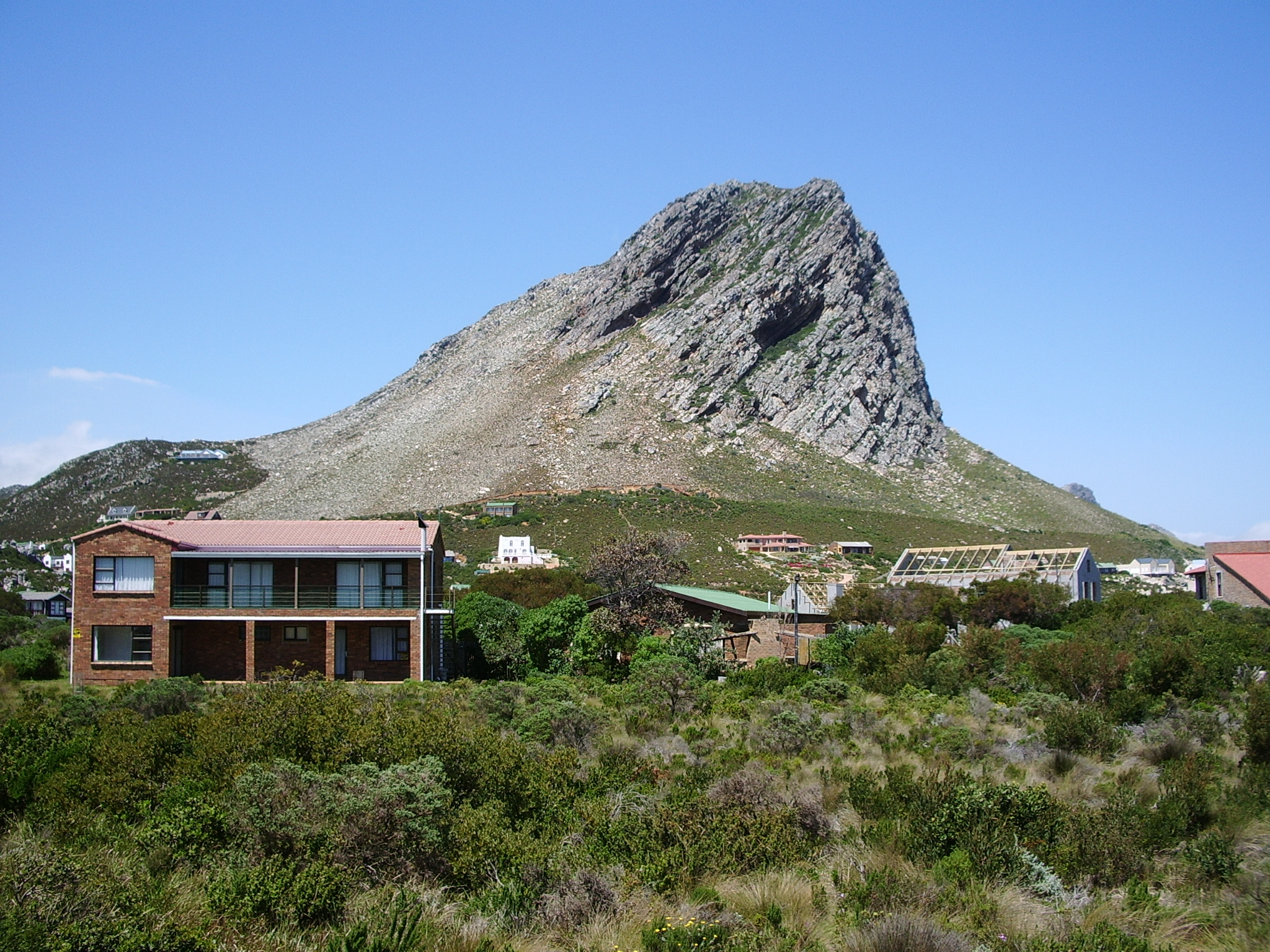
Klein-Hangklip on the eastern edge of False Bay as seen from Rooi-Els

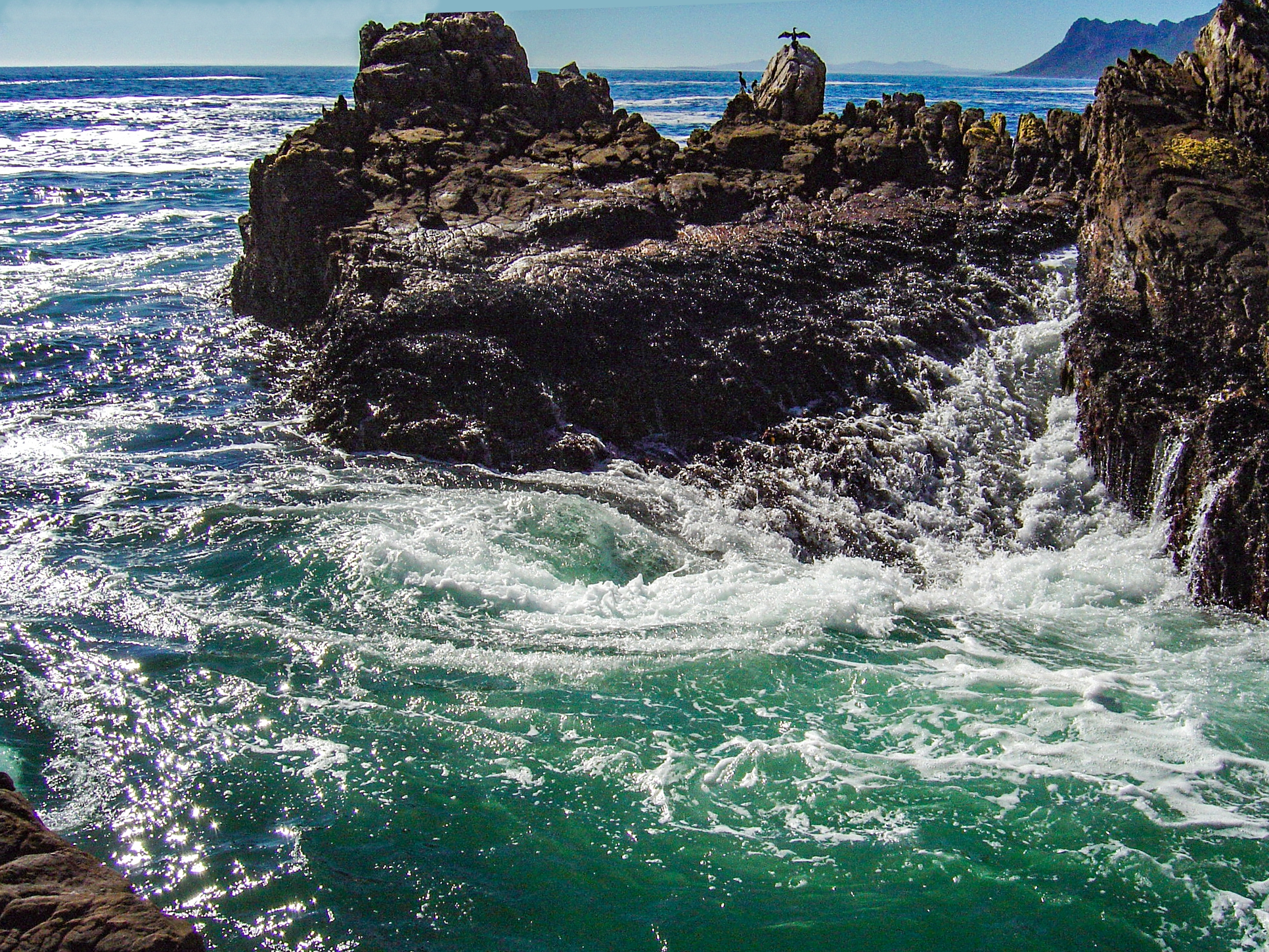
A whirlpool between the large rocks characteristic for the coast line

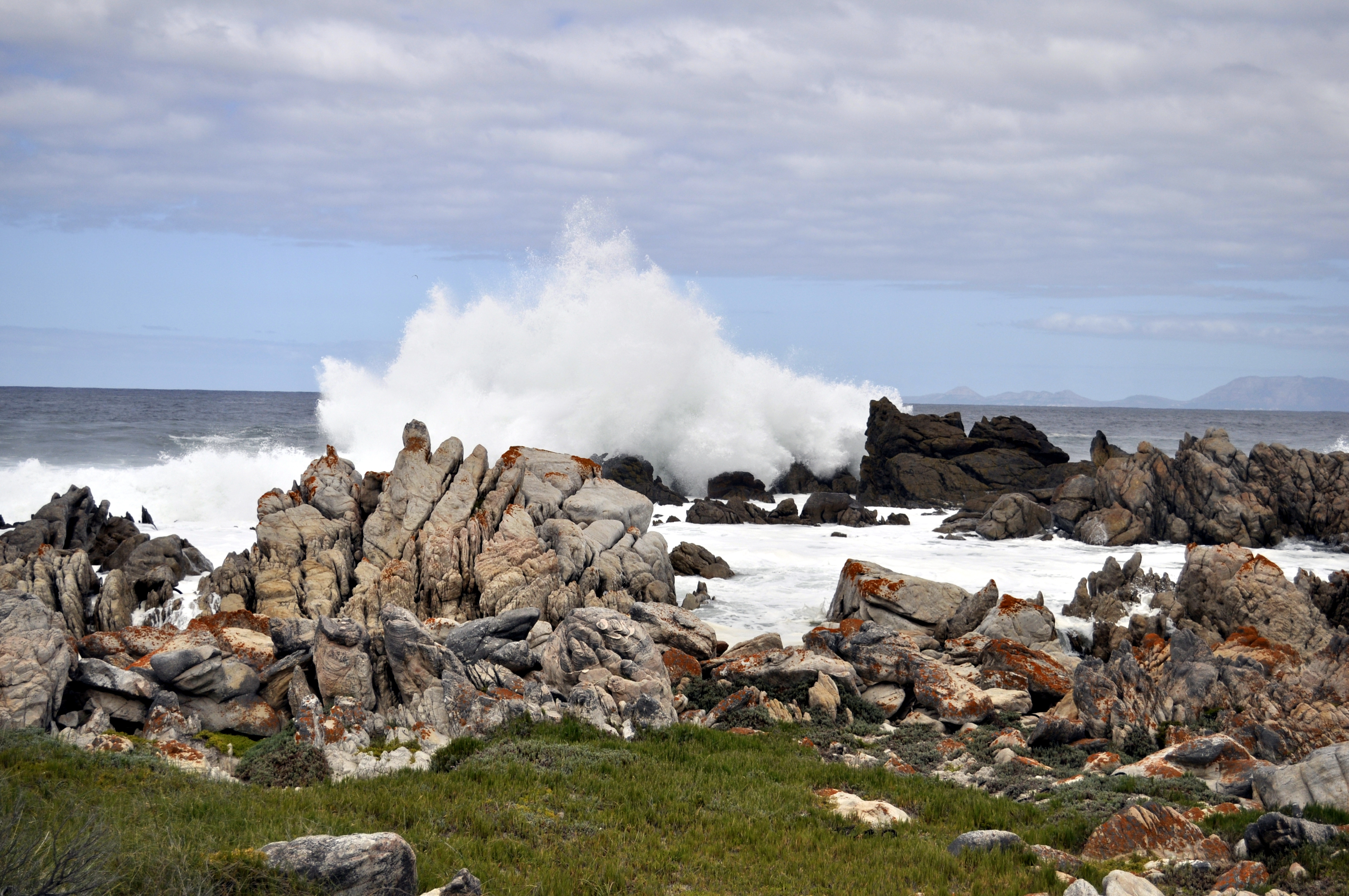
Surf causing high breaking waves at the coastal rocks

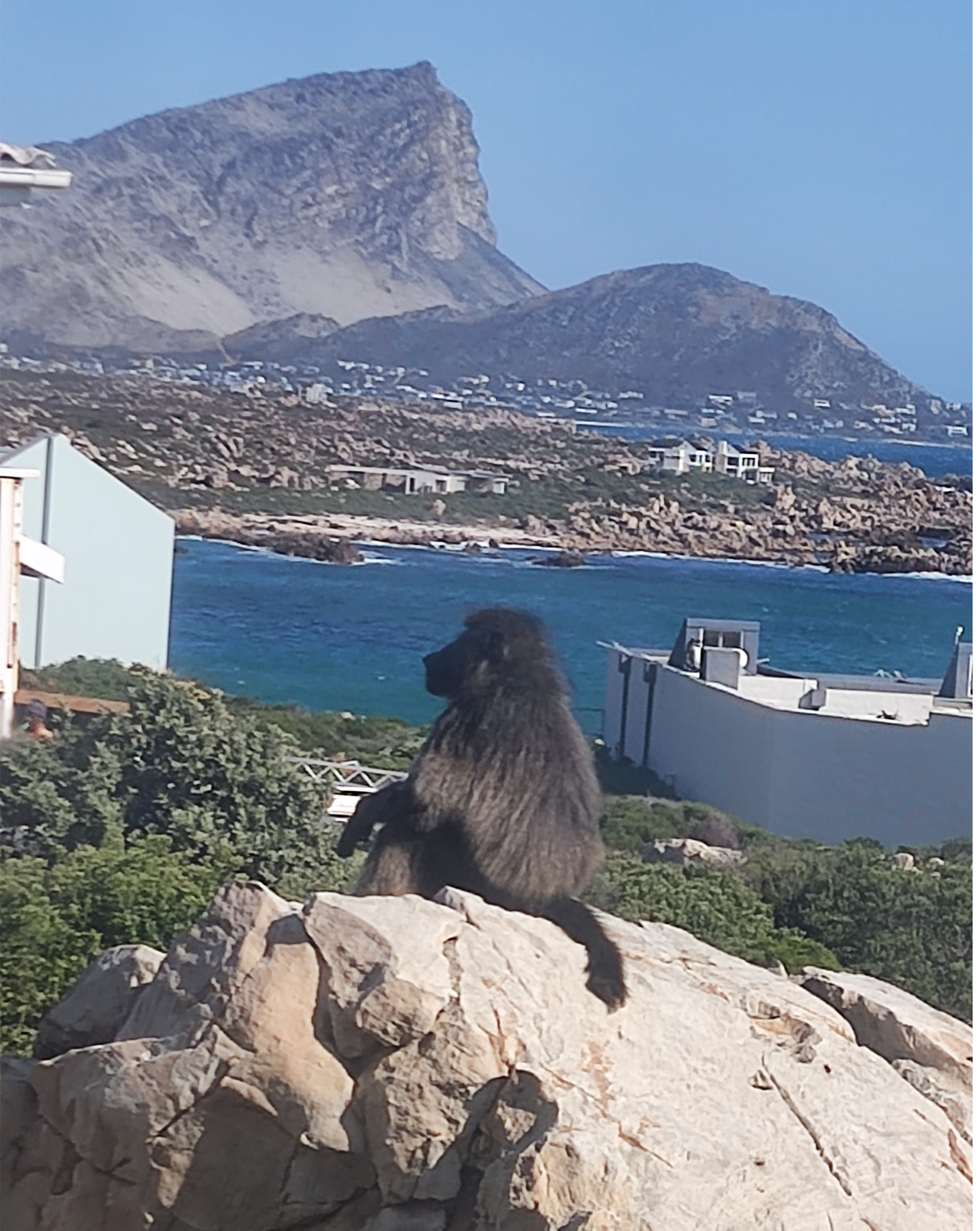
Chacma baboon in Rooiels
