= Table Mountain Sandstone =

Group of rock formations within the Cape Supergroup sequence of rocks

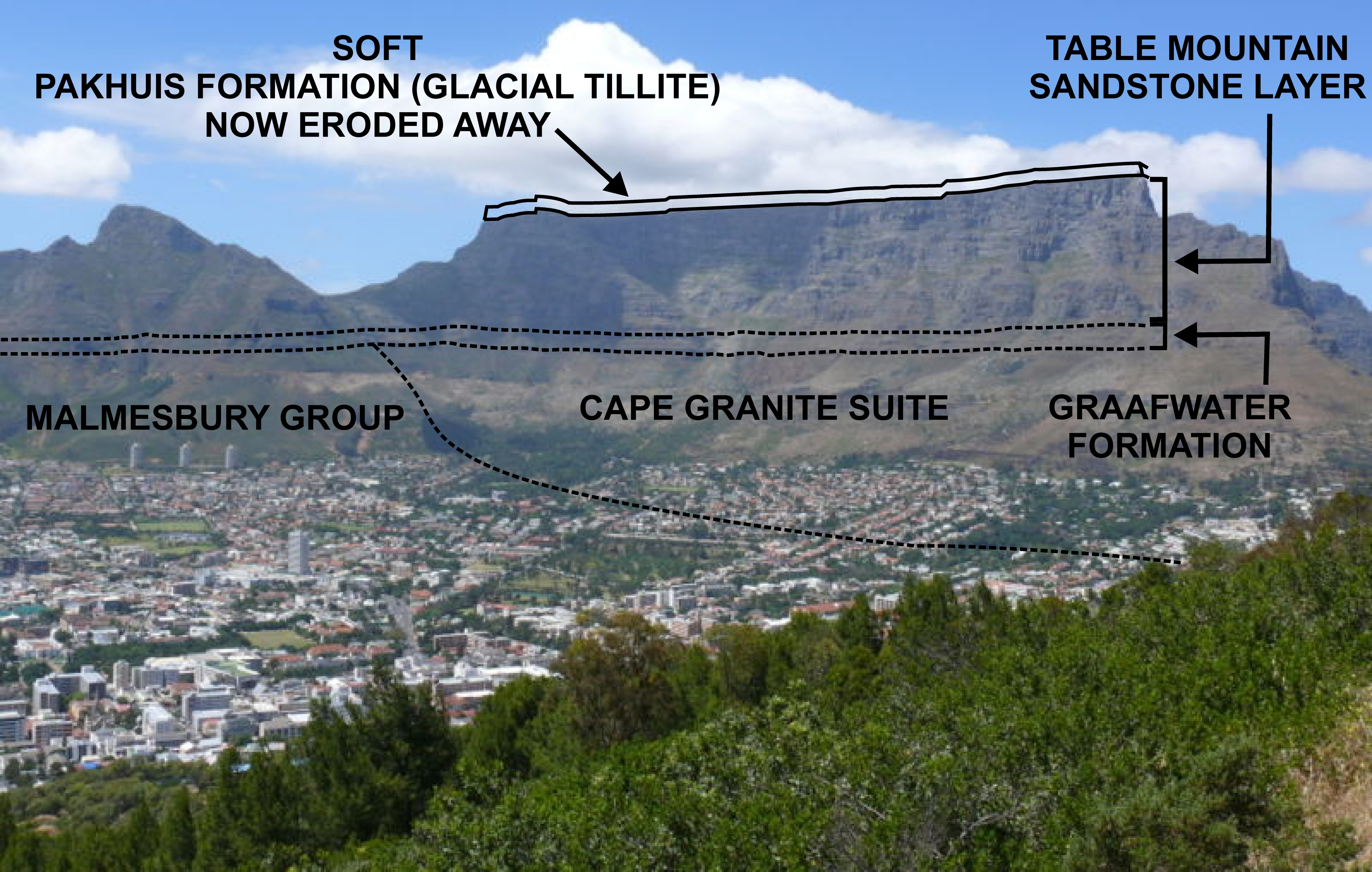
Table Mountain seen from Signal Hill, across the Cape Town city bowl. The portion of the mountain made up of Table Mountain Sandstone is indicated on the right. It is this mountain that has given its name to the geological structure that occurs in the mountains throughout the Western Cape

Table Mountain Sandstone (TMS), formally known by its geological name the Peninsula Formation Sandstone, is a group of rock formations within the Cape Supergroup sequence. While the term "Table Mountain Sandstone" remains widely used, it is no longer formally recognized; the correct geological name is "Peninsula Formation Sandstone," which is part of the Table Mountain Group. The name originates from Table Mountain, the famous landmark in Cape Town, South Africa. For consistency with common usage, the term "Table Mountain Sandstone" will continue to be used throughout this article.

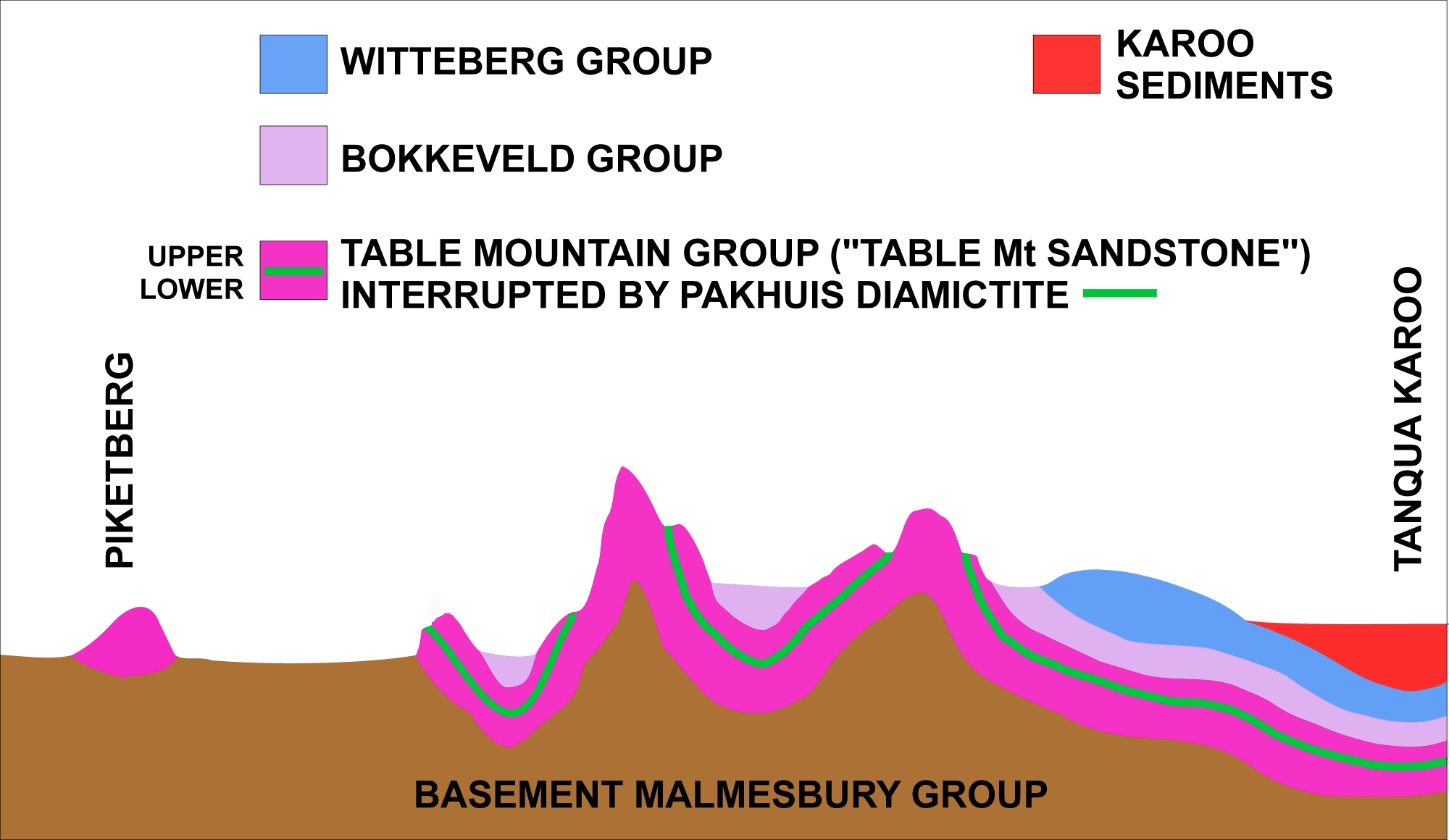
Schematic diagram of an approximate 100 km west-east (left to right) geological cross-section through the Cedarberg portion of the Cape Fold Belt (South Africa). The rocky layers (in different colors) belong to the Cape Supergroup. Not to scale. The green layer is the Pakhuis diamictite formation which divides the Table Mountain Sandstone (or Peninsula Formation Sandstone) into a lower and upper portion. It is the lower (older) portion that is particularly hard and erosion resistant, and, therefore, forms most of the highest and most conspicuous peaks in the Western Cape, as well as the steepest cliffs of the Cape Fold Mountains (including Table Mountain - see upper illustration). The Upper Table Mountain Sandstone Formation, above the Pakhuis tillite layer, is considerably softer and more easily eroded than the lower Formation. In the Cederberg Mountains This formation has been sculpted by wind erosion into many fantastic shapes and caverns, for which these mountains have become famous. The Graafwater Formation forms the lowermost layer of the Cape Supergroup in this region, but is, for simplicity, incorporated into the Table Mountain Sandstone Formation in this diagram.

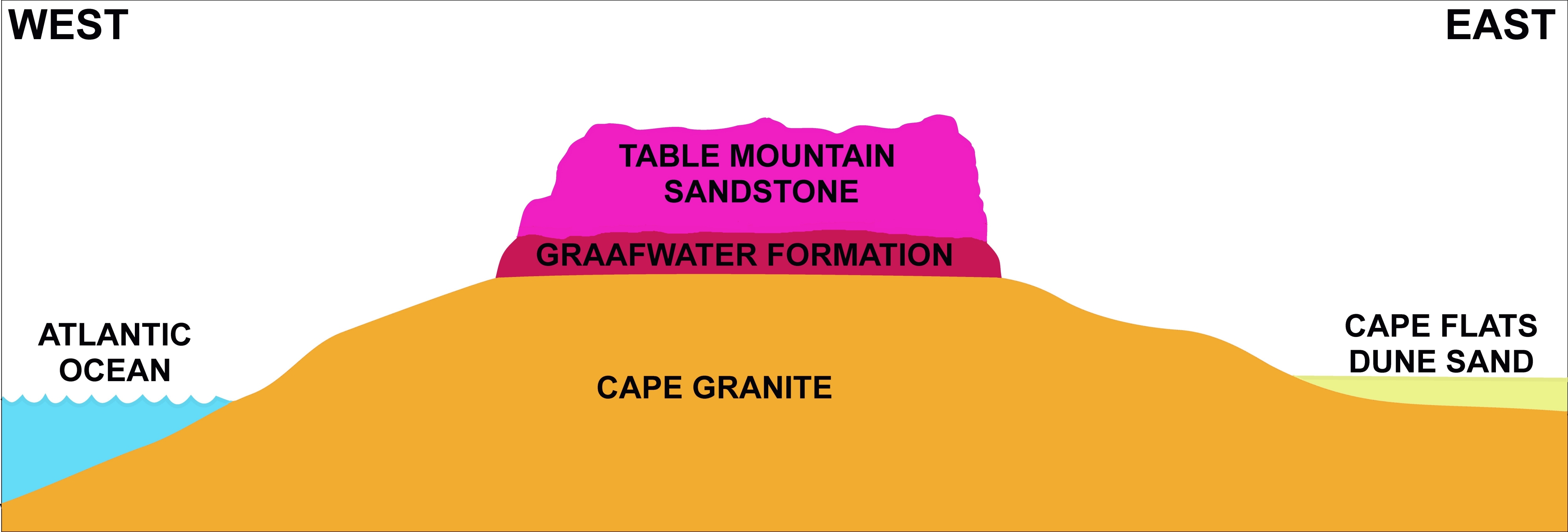
Schematic geological west-east cross section through Cape Peninsula, based on a section through the Back Table just south of Table Mountain. Not to scale. On the Peninsula the basement layer consists in the main of Cape Granite. The Table Mountain Sandstone (in the same colour as in the diagram on the left) forms the steep escarpments that surround the approximately 5 km-wide central plateau. It consists of the layer below the "Pakhuis diamictite", of which there is only a trace at the highest point on Table Mountain at 1085 m above sea level. The lowermost formation of the Table Mountain Group is the "Graafwater Formation", which rests unconformally on the Cape Granite base, as opposed to the Malmesbury Formation base in most of the rest of the extent of Cape Supergroup in the Western Cape (see illustration above, on the left). Kirstenbosch Botanical Gardens, and all the major wines estates on the Peninsula are situated on the fertile (weathered) granite slopes on the east side of the mountain. The soils derived from Table Mountain Sandstone are very poor in nutrition.

Composed primarily of quartzitic sandstone, Table Mountain Sandstone was deposited between 510 million years ago (Cambrian Period) and 400 million years ago (Devonian Period). It is the hardest and most erosion-resistant layer of the Cape Supergroup, making it responsible for the highest peaks and steepest cliffs of the Cape Fold Belt. Despite being the oldest and lowermost layer of the Cape Supergroup, its resistance to erosion has allowed it to persist as the dominant rock formation in many prominent landscapes across the Western Cape.

The folding of the Cape Supergroup into the parallel mountain ranges of the Western Cape began approximately 330 million years ago, shaping the landscape from Clanwilliam (about 200 km north of Cape Town) to Port Elizabeth (about 650 km east of Cape Town). Beyond these points, the Cape Supergroup sediments are not folded into mountain ranges but instead form steep cliffs and gorges, where surrounding sediments have been eroded away, as seen in locations like Oribi Gorge in KwaZulu-Natal.

== Origins ==
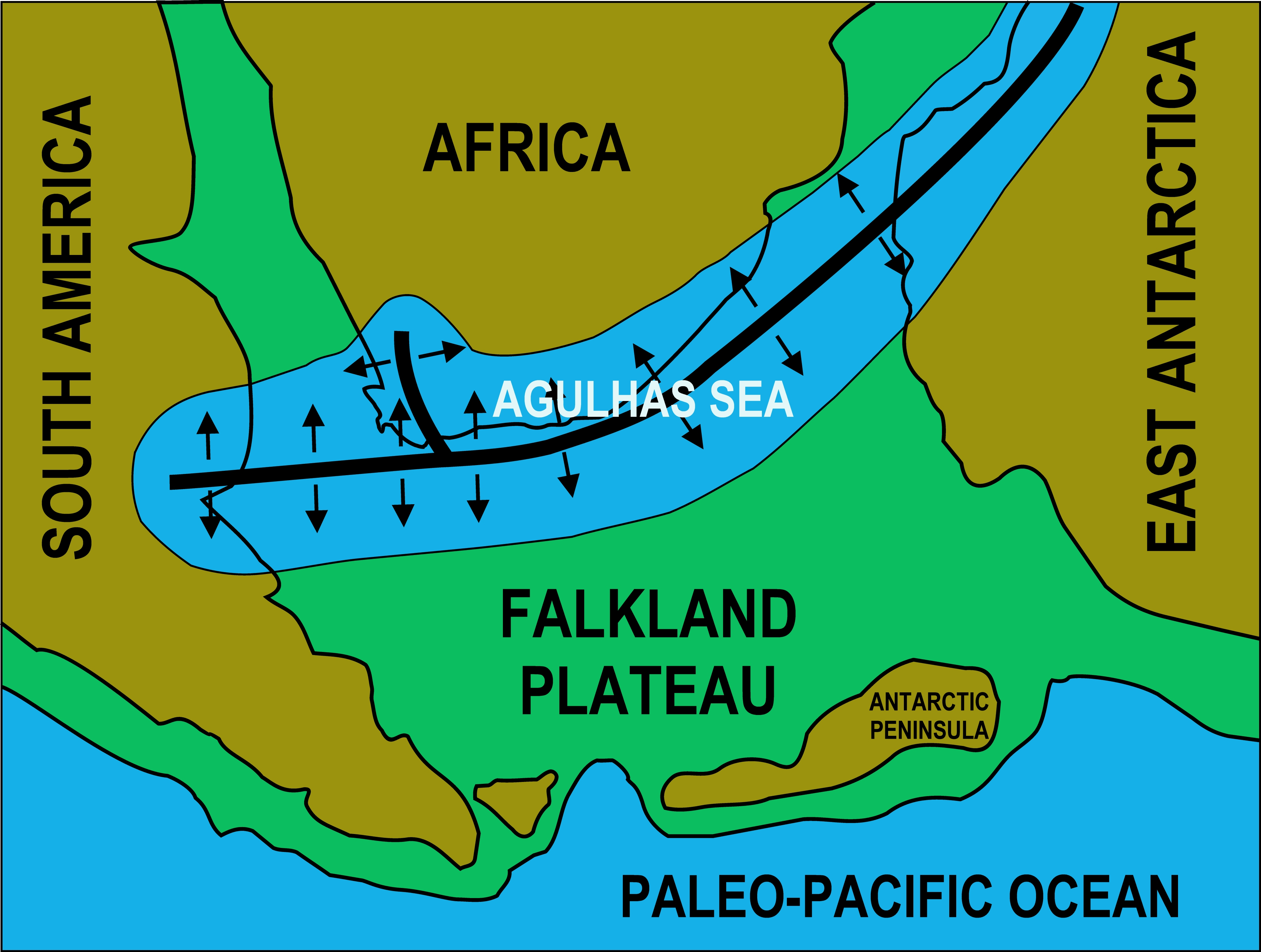
Southern Gondwana during the Cambrian-Ordovician Periods. Today's continents into which this Supercontinent eventually broke up, are indicated in brown. A rift developed about 510 million years ago, separating Southern Africa from the Falkland Plateau. Flooding of the rift formed the Agulhas Sea. The sediments which accumulated in this shallow sea consolidated to form the Cape Supergroup of rocks, which form the Cape Fold Belt today. This portion of Gondwana was probably located on the opposite side of the South Pole from Africa's present position, but compass bearings are nevertheless given as if Africa was in its present position.

The Cape Supergroup rocks were laid down as sediments in a rift valley that developed in southern Gondwana, just south of Southern Africa, during the Cambrian-Ordovician Periods (starting about 510 million years ago, and ending about 330-350 million years ago). An 8 km thick layer of sediment accumulated on the floor of this rift valley. Closure of the rift valley, starting 330 million years ago, resulted from the drift of the Falkland Plateau back towards Africa, during the Carboniferous and Early Permian periods. This caused the rucking of the Cape Supergroup into a series of parallel folds, running mainly east-west, but with a short section running north-south in the west (resulting from the collision with the eastward movement of Patagonia into southern Africa). Continued subduction of the paleo-Pacific Plate beneath the Falkland Plateau and the resulting further compression of the latter into Southern Africa, raised a mountain range of immense proportions to the south of the former rift valley. The folded Cape Supergroup formed the northern foothills of this towering mountain range.

Sediments, eroded from this immense Falkland Mountain range to the south, buried the folded Cape Supergroup rocks, and the plains beyond (to the north) to ultimately form the Karoo Supergroup, a sequence of sediments that eventually covered most of southern Africa and other parts of Gondwana. The Cape Supergroup re-emerged as mountains when uplift of the subcontinent, about 180 million years ago, and again 20 million years ago, started an episode of continuous erosion that was to remove many kilometres of surface deposits from Southern Africa. Although the tops of the original Cape Fold Mountains were eroded away, the hard Table Mountain Sandstone component eroded much slower, forming the backbone of the Cape Fold Mountains, with the younger, but very much softer Bokkeveld shales remaining only in the valleys (see diagram on the left).

The Falkland Mountain range had probably eroded into relative insignificance by the mid-Jurassic Period, and started drifting to the south-west soon after Gondwana began to break up 150 million years ago, leaving the Cape Fold Belt to edge the southern portion of the newly formed African continent. Even though the mountains are very old by Andean and Alpine standards, they remain steep and rugged due to the Table Mountain Sandstone's quartzitic sandstone geology, making them very resistant to weathering.

The degree to which the original Cape Fold mountains (formed during the Carboniferous and early Permian Periods) have been eroded is attested to by the fact that the 1 km high Table Mountain on the Cape Peninsula is a syncline mountain, meaning that it once formed part of the bottom of a valley when the Cape Supergroup was initially folded. The anticline, or highest elevation of the fold between Table Mountain and the Hottentots-Holland Mountains to the east, on the opposite side of the isthmus connecting the Peninsula to the mainland, has been eroded away. The Malmesbury shale and granite basement on which this anticline mountain rested also formed an anticline; but being composed of much softer rocks, readily weathered into a 50 km wide sandy plain, called the "Cape Flats" (see diagram below, on the right).

A west-east (left to right) geological cross section through Table Mountain on the Cape Peninsula, the Cape Flats (the isthmus connecting the Peninsula to the African mainland) and the Hottentots-Holland Mountains on the mainland, indicating how much of the Cape Fold Mountains has been eroded away.

== Structure ==
Table Mountain Sandstone Formation is, barring the Graafwater Formation, the oldest component of the Cape Supergroup. It was laid down as sandy deposits, with a maximum thickness of 2000 m, in a flooded rift valley. It contains no fossils. Its subsequent burial under the other Formations in the Cape Supergroup, and thereafter under the sediments brought down from the Falkland Mountain range, compressed and partially metamorphosed the original sandy deposits into very hard quartzitic sandstones, which in their folded configuration form the peaks, steep cliffs and rugged crags of the Cape Fold Mountains. During the deposition phase a short period of glaciation left a layer of tillite, called the Pakhuis Formation, which today divides the Table Mountain Sandstone Formation into a lower and upper layer. It is particularly the lower layer which is now extremely hard and erosion resistant, causing it to form most of the summits, crags and high cliffs that characterize the Cape Fold Mountain ranges (see illustration second from the top left), as well as the sheer rock faces of upper 600 m of Table Mountain.

A small patch of Pakhuis tillite occurs on the top of Table Mountain at Maclear's beacon, but most of the Pakhuis Formation is found as a thin layer (on average only about 60 m thick) in the Table Mountain Sandstone Formation of the more inland mountains to the west of a line between Swellendam and Calvinia. These diamictite rocks are composed of finely ground mud, containing a jumble of faceted pebbles. They can easily be recognized at a distance as this formation readily erodes into fertile, gently sloping, green swaths in a landscape where this contrasts starkly with the bare rocky surfaces of the quartzites above and below. In several locations the quartzites immediately below the glacial horizon have been rucked into a series of folds. This is believed to have been caused by the movement of ice ploughing into the underlying unconsolidated sands. A good example of this can be seen on a ridge of rocks near Maclear's Beacon on Table Mountain, close to the edge of the plateau overlooking the Cape Town City Bowl and Table Bay.

The Upper Table Mountain Sandstone Formation, above the Pakhuis and Cederberg Formations, consists of much softer sandstone than the Lower Table Mountain Sandstone Formation, and is often referred to as the Nardouw Formation. In the Cederberg this formation has been eroded by the wind into a wide variety of "sculptures", caves, and other fascinating structures for which these mountains have become well-known.

=== Sediments below the Table Mountain Sandstone ===
The initial sediments into the still shallow rift valley, that was to turn into the Agulhas Sea, were alternating layers of maroon coloured mudstones and buff coloured sandstones, each mostly between 10 and 30 cm thick. The mudstone units commonly display ripple marks from the ebb and flow of tidal currents, as well as polygonal sand-filled mud cracks that indicate occasional exposure to desiccation. This layer, known as the Graafwater Formation, reaches a maximum thickness of 400 m, but on the Cape Peninsula it is only 60–70 m thick. No fossils have been found in the Graafwater rocks, but shallow-water animal tracks have been found. A particularly good example of these tracks can be viewed in the foyer of the Geology Department of the University of Stellenbosch, where a slab of Graafwater rock from the Cederberg mountains has been built into the wall.

=== Sediments above the Table Mountain Sandstone ===
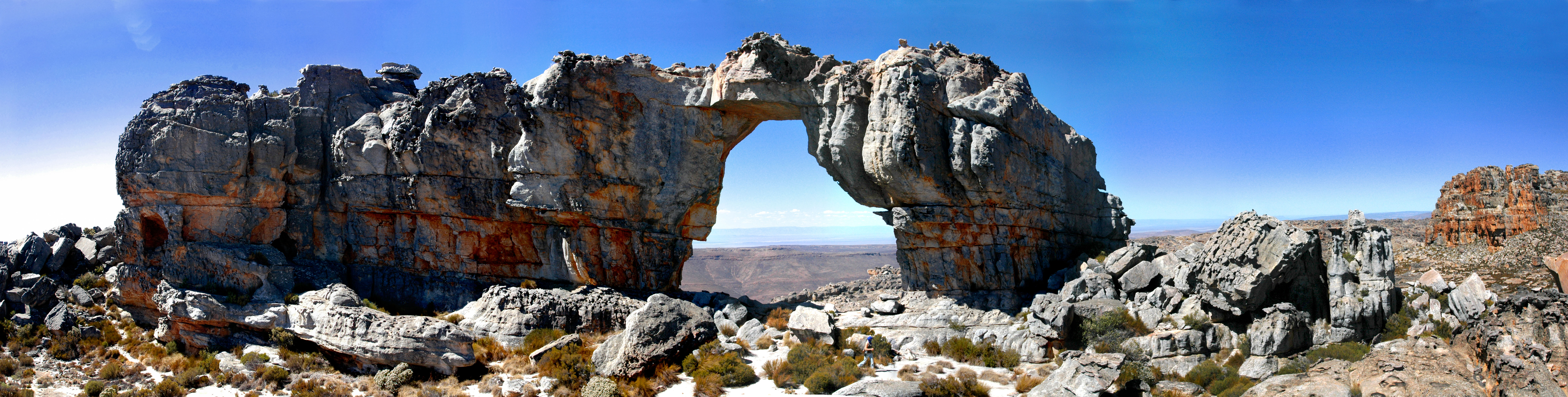
Wolfberg Arch in the Cederberg, a "sculpture" carved by the wind in the softer, more easily eroded Upper Table Mountain Sandstone Formation, or Nardouw Formation as it is sometimes known.

About 400 million years ago (in the early Devonian Period) there was further subsidence of the rift valley floor. This brought about the deposition of deeper-water, fine grained sediments of the Bokkeveld Group. This is in marked contrast to the predominantly sandy sediments of the Table Mountain Group. The Bokkeveld Group consists predominantly mudstones.

After the Cape Supergroup had been folded into the Cape Fold Mountains, these soft mudstones readily washed away from the mountain tops, and only remain in the valleys. Here they form the fertile soils on which the vines and fruit orchards of the Western Cape flourish with the help of irrigation from the rivers that have their sources in the surrounding mountains.

The Bokkeveld Group does not extend on to the Cape Peninsula or its isthmus (the Cape Flats). Here the Stellenbosch, Franschhoek, Paarl, Durbanville, Tulbagh and Constantia vineyards have been planted on the weathered Cape Granite and Malmesbury shale soils, which form the basement rocks on which the Cape Supergroup rocks in this region rest.

The bulk of the fossils found in the Cape Supergroup occur in the Bokkeveld mudstones. They include a variety of brachiopods, as well as trilobites, molluscs, echinoderms (including starfish, crinoids, and the extinct blastoids and cystoids), foraminifera and fish with jaws (placoderms). The upper layers of the Bokkeveld Group become increasingly more sandy, grading into the sandstone of the Witteberg Group, named for the range of mountains to the south of Matjiesfontein and Laingsburg in the southern Karoo. These rocks were laid down 370 - 330 million years ago in the silted up, and therefore shallow marine conditions of what remained of the Agulhas Sea. The group contains fewer fossils than the Bokkeveld Group, but the assemblage that is preserved includes primitive fish, an extinct species of shark, brachiopods, bivalves, and a metre long sea scorpion. There are also plant fossils and numerous animal tracks.

The Witteberg Group is truncated by the overlying Dwyka sediments of glacial origin. The latter forms part of the Karoo Supergroup. Therefore, the Witteberg Group forms the uppermost layer of the Cape Supergroup. It tends to form the most inland outcrops of the Cape Supergroup, having been eroded away completely from all of its higher elevations above the present day Cape Fold Mountain ranges.

== Ecology ==
The termite species Amitermes hastatus is endemic to areas with sand eroded from Table Mountain Sandstone.

== See also ==
- Table Mountain – Mountain overlooking Cape Town, South Africa
- Cape Fold Belt – Paleozoic fold and thrust belt in South Africa
- Cape Supergroup – Paleozoic fold and thrust belt in South Africa
- Malmesbury Formation and the intrusive Cape Granite
- Geography of South Africa
