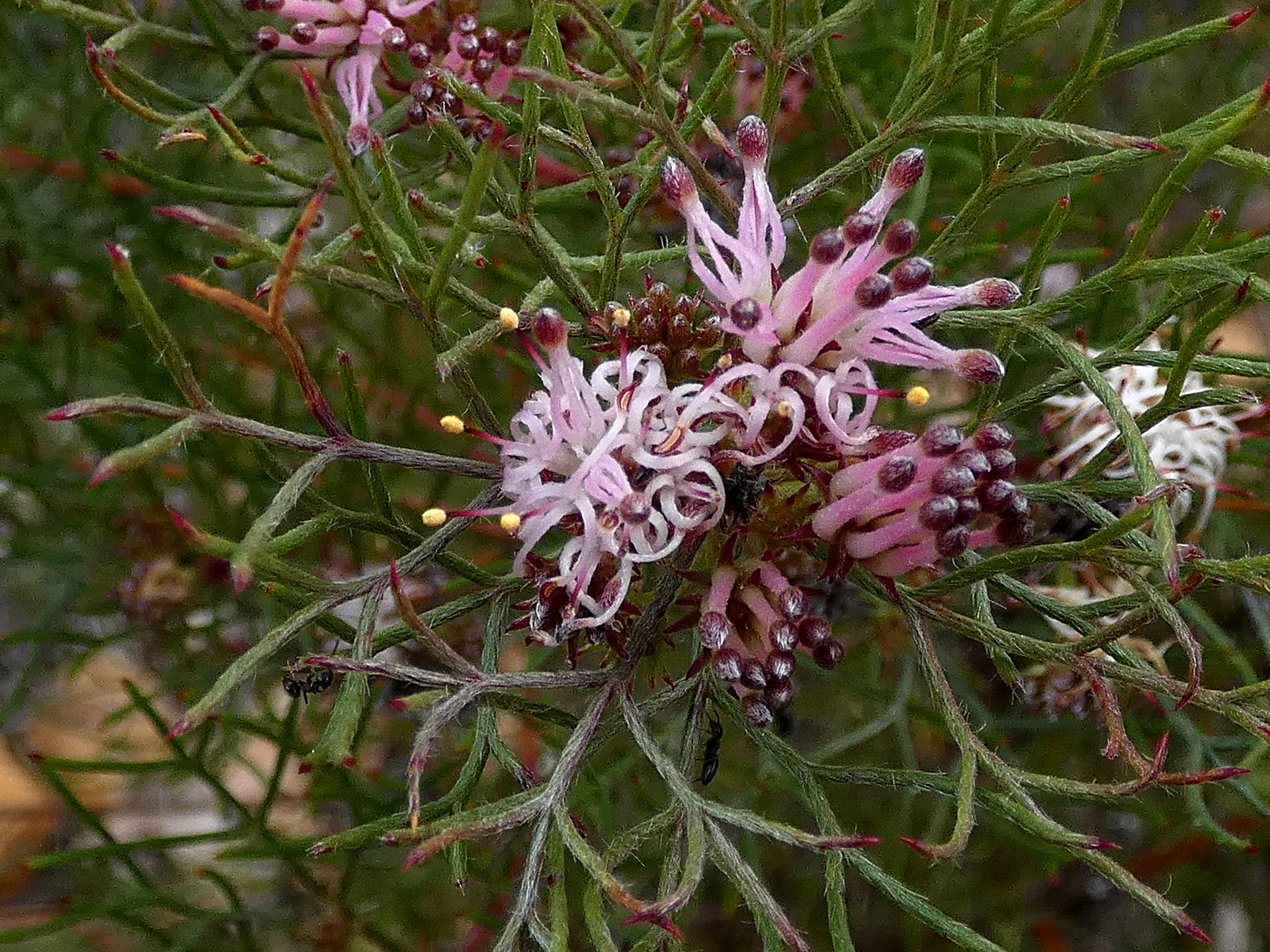

Conservation status
- Least Concern (IUCN 3.1)

Scientific classification
- Kingdom: Plantae
- Clade: Embryophytes
- Clade: Tracheophytes
- Clade: Angiosperms
- Clade: Eudicots
- Order: Proteales
- Family: Proteaceae
- Genus: Serruria
- Species: S. fasciflora

Binomial name
- Serruria fasciflora Salisb. ex Knight

Synonyms
- S. biglandulosa; S. burmannii; S. knightii; S. pauciflora; S. subsericea

= Serruria fasciflora =

Species of plant native to South Africa

Serruria fasciflora or common pin spiderhead is a species of flowering plant in the family Proteaceae. It is a sprawling to upright shrublet of 40 cm to 1 m (1 1/3–3 1/3 ft) high and about 1/2 m (1 2/3 ft) wide. It has finely divided, upward curving leaves with thread-thin segments and clusters of sweetly scented heads, each consisting of five to seven silvery pink flowers, that may be found year-round, but mostly from May to December. It is a rather widespread and common species, that is restricted to the south of the Western Cape province of South Africa.

== Description ==
Serruria fasciflora is a much branched, sprawling to upright perennial shrublet of 40 cm to 1 m (1 1/3–3 1/3 ft) high and about 1/2 m (1 2/3 ft) wide, with purplish, initially felty or powdery hairs that are lost later on. It has sparsely hairy, twice finely divided in the upper half to two thirds, green leaves of 3–7 cm (1.2–2.8 in) long and 2 1/2–3 1/2 cm (1.0–1.4 in) wide. The furthest segments up to about 2 cm (3/4 in) long, awl- to almost threat-shaped with a very pointy tip.

It bears a broad corymb of ten to fifteen flat-topped flower heads on a short hairy stalk, that is enclosed by leaves. The stalks of the individual flower heads are 0.65–1.9 cm (1/4–3/4 in) long, slender, densely softly hairy, with a single awl-shaped softly hairy bract of about 4 mm (0.16 in) long just below the head. Each flower head is about 8 mm (1/3 in) across, consists of five to seven silvery pink, sweetly scented flowers, and is subtended by a lance-shaped floral bract.

The felty bract subtending the individual flower is more or less oval, with a thickened, later hairless glandular tip, about 3 mm (0.12 in) long. The 4-merous flowers are slightly curved before they open. The lower part, that remains merged when the flower is open, called perianth-tube is covered with long soft hairs and about 1 1/2 mm (0.06 in) long. The middle part (or claws) consists of four segments each of about 1/2 cm (0.2 in) long, line- to threat-shaped with short densely matted woolly hairs pressed to its surface. The upper part (or limbs), which enclosed the pollen presenter in the bud, are 1 1/2 mm (0.06 in) long, elliptic in shape with an almost pointy tip and covered with densely matted woolly hairs. The four anthers are each almost directly attached to the limbs and about 1.4 mm (0.055 in) long. From the center of each flower emerges a style of 5–7 mm (0.20–0.28 in) long, topped by a slightly pointy, almost hoof-shaped stigma of 3/4 mm (0.028 in) long. The ovary is covered with fine soft short hairs. The inverted egg-shaped fruit is about 4 mm (0.16 in) long has short felty hairs in the upper half.

== Taxonomy ==
The common pin spiderhead was first described in 1809 in a book by Joseph Knight titled On the cultivation of the plants belonging to the natural order of Proteeae, that contained an extensive revision of the Proteaceae attributed to Richard Anthony Salisbury. Salisbury described the common pin spiderhead and called it Serruria fasciflora. It is assumed that Salisbury had committed plagiarism by making use of a draft he had seen of a paper called On the natural order of plants called Proteaceae. Robert Brown was to publish this book in 1810, in which he describe a plant quite like that of Salisbury, but not identical and he called it S. burmannii. In 1897, Rudolf Schlechter again had a slightly different plant that he distinguished as S. biglandulosa. In 1912, two variants were described by John Hutchinson as S. knightii and S. subsericea, and one by Hutchinson with Edwin Percy Phillips also in 1912, that was called S. pauciflora. These plants differ in the hairiness of the leaves and petals, and the size of the flowerheads, but since then the general consensus has become that these types grade into each other, and should best be dealt with as one variable species.

== Distribution, habitat and ecology ==
Serruria fasciflora is widespread across flats and mountainous areas from the West Coast, as far north as Hopefield and south to the Cape Peninsula, to the Outeniqua Mountains in the east. On the Cape Peninsula it is common on the lower slopes and sands of Muizenberg. It has an extremely variable habitat, and occurs between sea level and 600 m (2000 ft) elevation. It can cope with windy, hot and dry summers and cool wet winters, but does not tolerate frosts. Serruria fasciflora is specifically adapted for pollination by flies, as they have a very sweet scent. The common pin spiderhead survives the regular wildfires in fynbos through its seeds. The fruits fall to the ground about two months after flowering. These have a fleshy covering (or elaiosome) that secretes a pheromone and attracts ants. Native ants collect the fruits and carry these to their underground nests. Here the elaiosomes are eaten and the seeds remain underground until they germinate when conditions are favourable.
