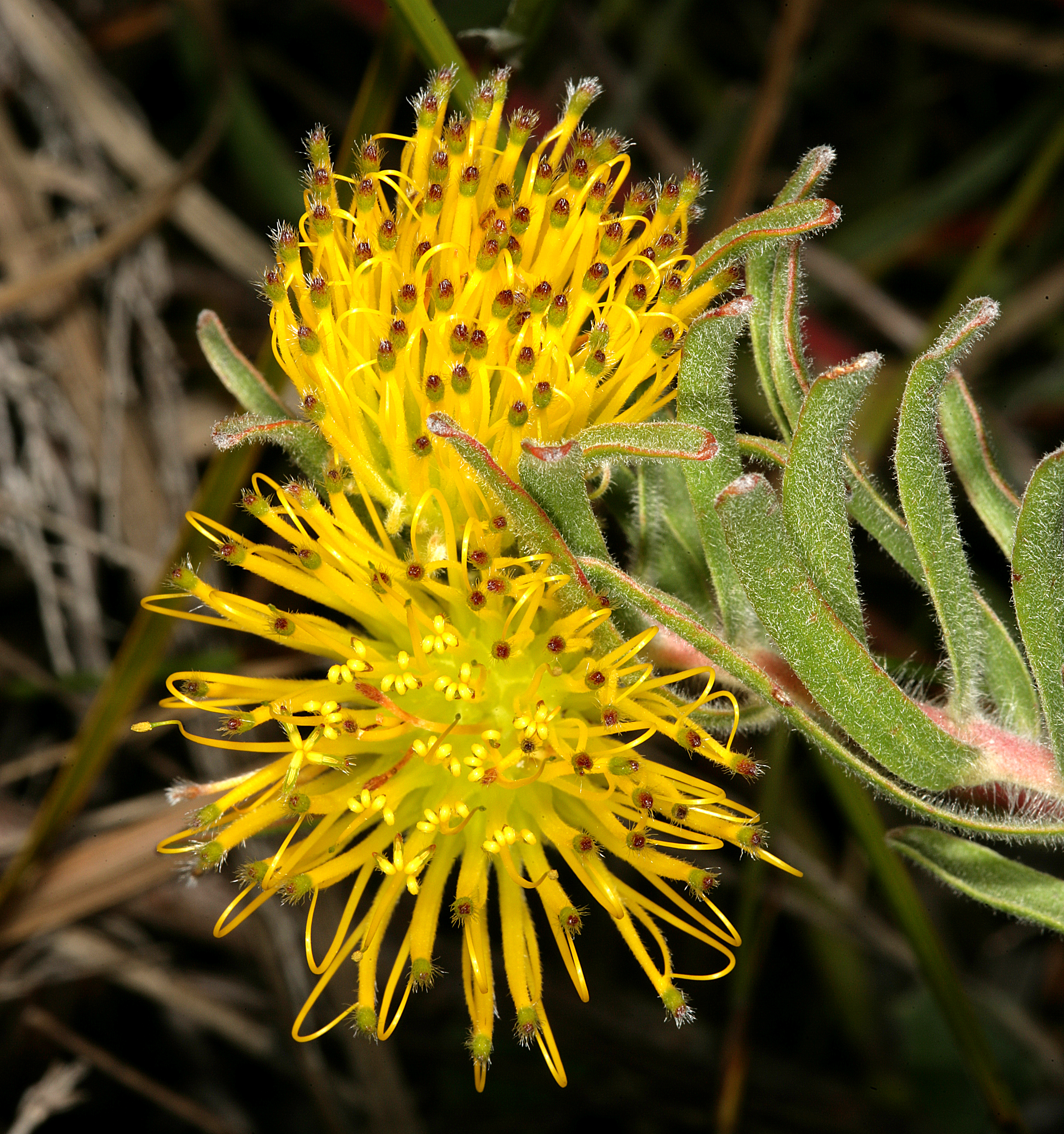

Conservation status
- Near Threatened (IUCN 3.1)

Scientific classification
- Kingdom: Plantae
- Clade: Embryophytes
- Clade: Tracheophytes
- Clade: Angiosperms
- Clade: Eudicots
- Order: Proteales
- Family: Proteaceae
- Genus: Leucospermum
- Species: L. gracile

Binomial name
- Leucospermum gracile (Salisb. ex Knight) Rourke

Synonyms
- Leucadendrum gracile; Leucospermum stenanthum

= Leucospermum gracile =

Shrub from the Western Cape of South Africa

Leucospermum gracile is a low spreading shrub of 30–40 cm (1–1⅓ ft) high and forms open mats of 1½ m (5 ft) in diameter, from the family Proteaceae. It has reddish flowering stems, oblong to linear leaves of 2–4½ cm (0.8–1.8 in) long and 2–5 mm (0.08–0.20 in) wide, with one or three teeth. The initially yellow, later orange flower heads of 2½–3 cm (1.0–1.2 in) in diameter are flat-topped. The flower heads occur from July to October. From the flowers occur long styles with a slightly thicker tip, which together give the impression of a pincushion. It is called Hermanus pincushion in English. It naturally occurs in fynbos in the southern mountains of the Western Cape province of South Africa.

== Description ==
Leucospermum gracile is a low spreading shrub of 30–40.0 cm (1–1⅓ ft) high that develops from a trunk at the base and forms open mats of 1½ m (5 ft) in diameter. The reddish flowering stems are slender, 2–3 mm (0.08–0.12 in) thick, felty and sometimes later hairless, that trail across the ground. The thinly felty or powdery leaves are oblong to linear, 2–4½ cm (0.8–1.8 in) long and 2–5 mm (0.08–0.20 in) wide, the far end blunt, entire or split in three lobes ending in a thick, bony tooth, and with a blunt or cut-off base. The leaves are mostly spaced widely and directed straight upwards, sometimes at a more relaxed angle.

The flower heads have a whorl shape (or are turbinate), are 2½–3 cm (1.0–1.2 in) in diameter, seated or with a stalk of up to 2 cm long, usually at a right angle with the stem. The common base of the flowers in the same head is flat and about ½ cm (0.2 in) wide. The bracts that subtend the head are very narrowly lance-shaped to linear 8−10 mm (0.32–0.40 in) long and 1–1½ mm (0.04–0.06 in) wide with a pointy tip, the ends in a small tuft of short hairs and some hairs rimming the edge, the surface softly hairy, cartilaginous in consistency and the bracts overlapping each other.

The bract that subtends each flower individually is inverted lance-shaped, suddenly pointy or pointed 5−6.0 mm (0.20−0.24 in)long and about 1½ mm (0.06 in) wide, cartilaginous in consistency, and the surface very thickly woolly. The 4-merous perianth is 2–2½ cm long, greenish at the base and yellow higher up. The lowest, fully merged, part of the perianth, called tube is funnel-shaped, 8 mm (0.32 in) long, hairless, but minutely powdery near the top. The middle part (or claws), where the perianth is split lengthwise are thread-shaped (or filiform), tightly rolling back near the top, the lobe facing the edge of the head hairless, the other roughly hairy. The upper part (or limbs), which enclosed the pollen presenter in the bud, consists of four 1 mm (0.04 in) long, pointy, narrowly lance-shaped lobes that are difficult to distinguish from the perianth claws. From the perianth emerges a straight, thread-shaped style of 2½–3 mm (0.10–0.12 in) long, that tapers towards the tip, and is initially yellow, later becoming pale green. The thickened part at the tip of the style called pollen presenter is 1.0 mm long, cylinder-shaped with a pointy tip, hardly differentiated from the style, with a groove that functions as the stigma across the very tip. The ovary is subtended by four opaque, hoof-shaped scales of about 3 mm long.

The subtribe Proteinae, to which the genus Leucospermum has been assigned, consistently has a basic chromosome number of twelve (2n=24).

=== Differences with related species ===
Leucospermum gracile differs from its closest relatives by its spreading habit, the narrow leaves (less than ½ cm wide), bitten-off at its base, the abruptly pointy inverted lance-shaped bracteoles and the yellow colour of the perianth. It may occur alongside Leucospermum prostratum and shares yellow flower heads that fade to orange, but in Leucospermum gracile these are larger and flat-topped, while the smaller flower heads of Leucospermum prostratum are domed when viewed from the side.

== Taxonomy ==
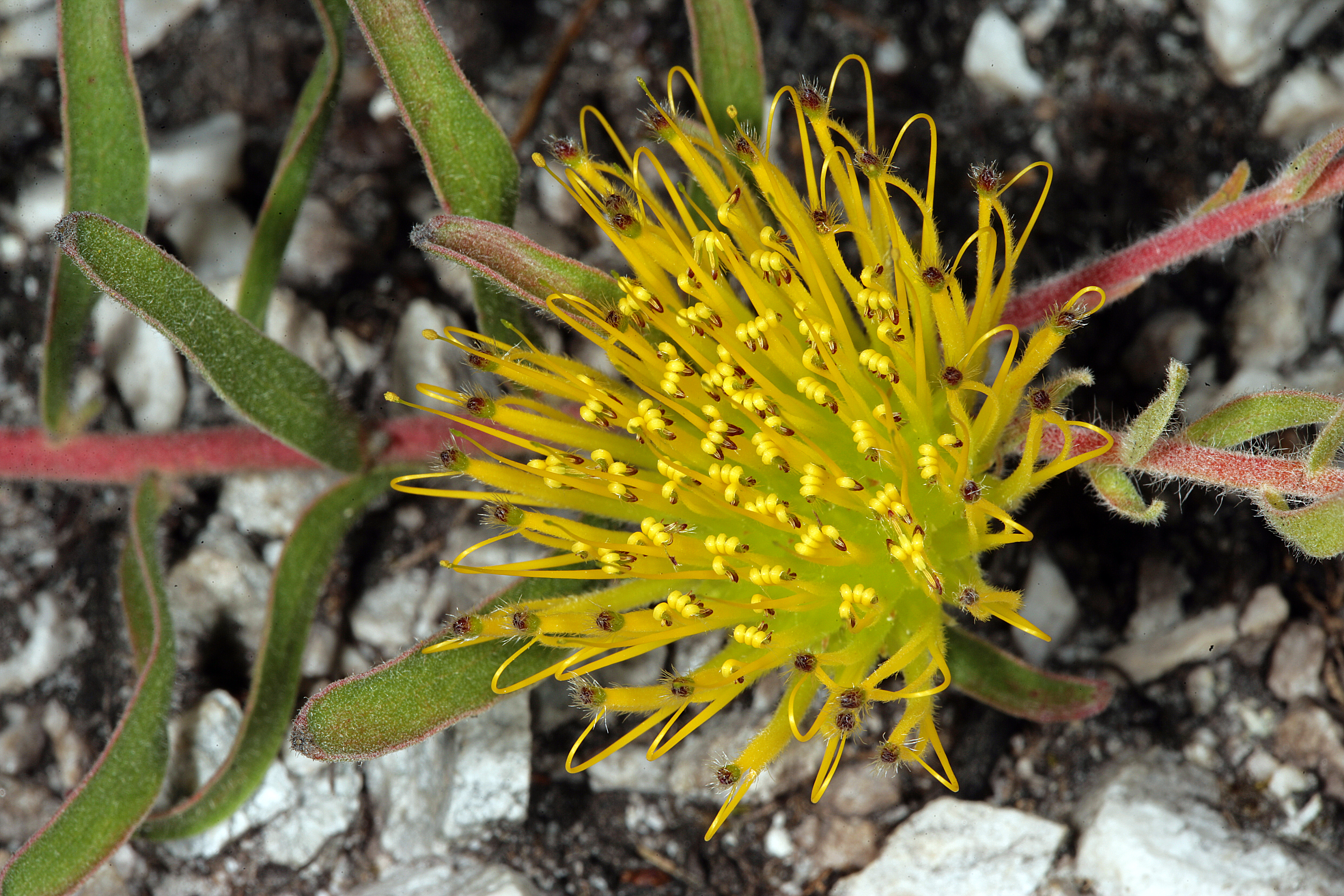
Trailing stem with leaves and flower head

As far as we know, James Niven was the first who collected the Hermanus pincushion, at Fernkloof in the foothills of the Kleinrivier Mountains. In 1809, Joseph Knight published a book titled On the cultivation of the plants belonging to the natural order of Proteeae, that contained an extensive revision of the Proteaceae attributed to Richard Anthony Salisbury. Salisbury assigned Niven's specimen to his new genus Leucadendrum and called it Leucadendrum gracile. It is assumed that Salisbury had committed plagiarism by making use of a draft he had seen of a paper called On the natural order of plants called Proteaceae that Robert Brown was to publish in 1810. The genus name Leucadendrum was therefore ignored by other botanists. In 1900 Brown's Leucospermum was officially conserved priority over Leucadendrum, that was suppressed. This however does not apply to Salisbury's species names, and in addition, Brown did not describe the Hermanus pincushion. Rudolf Schlechter described Leucospermum stenanthum in 1900. John Patrick Rourke in 1967, regards both names as synonymous, and recognised that the new combination Leucospermum gracile needed to be created. L. gracile has been assigned to the section Crinitae. The species name gracile means graceful.

== Distribution, habit and ecology ==
Leucospermum gracile can be found on Shaw's Mountain between Caledon in the north and Hermanus and through the Onrus Mountains and Kleinrivier Mountains, eastwards to the hillsides near Napier, usually at 100–300 m (300–1000 ft) altitude, sometimes reaching 900 m (3000 ft). It always grows in very well drained locations, particularly in the sandy surface layers of weathered and crumbling Table Mountain Sandstone. The location further to the north near Bot River where Schlechter collected, probably went extinct as a result of agricultural introduction. The species is pollinated by birds. The ripened fruit fall to the ground approximately two months after flowering. Native ants carry them to their underground nests to eat the elaiosome. The seed remains dormant until a fire has destroyed the above-ground biomass.

== Conservation ==
The Hermanus pincushion is considered a near threatened species, because its population has decreased by about 30% due to competition of invasive species and urban expansion.
