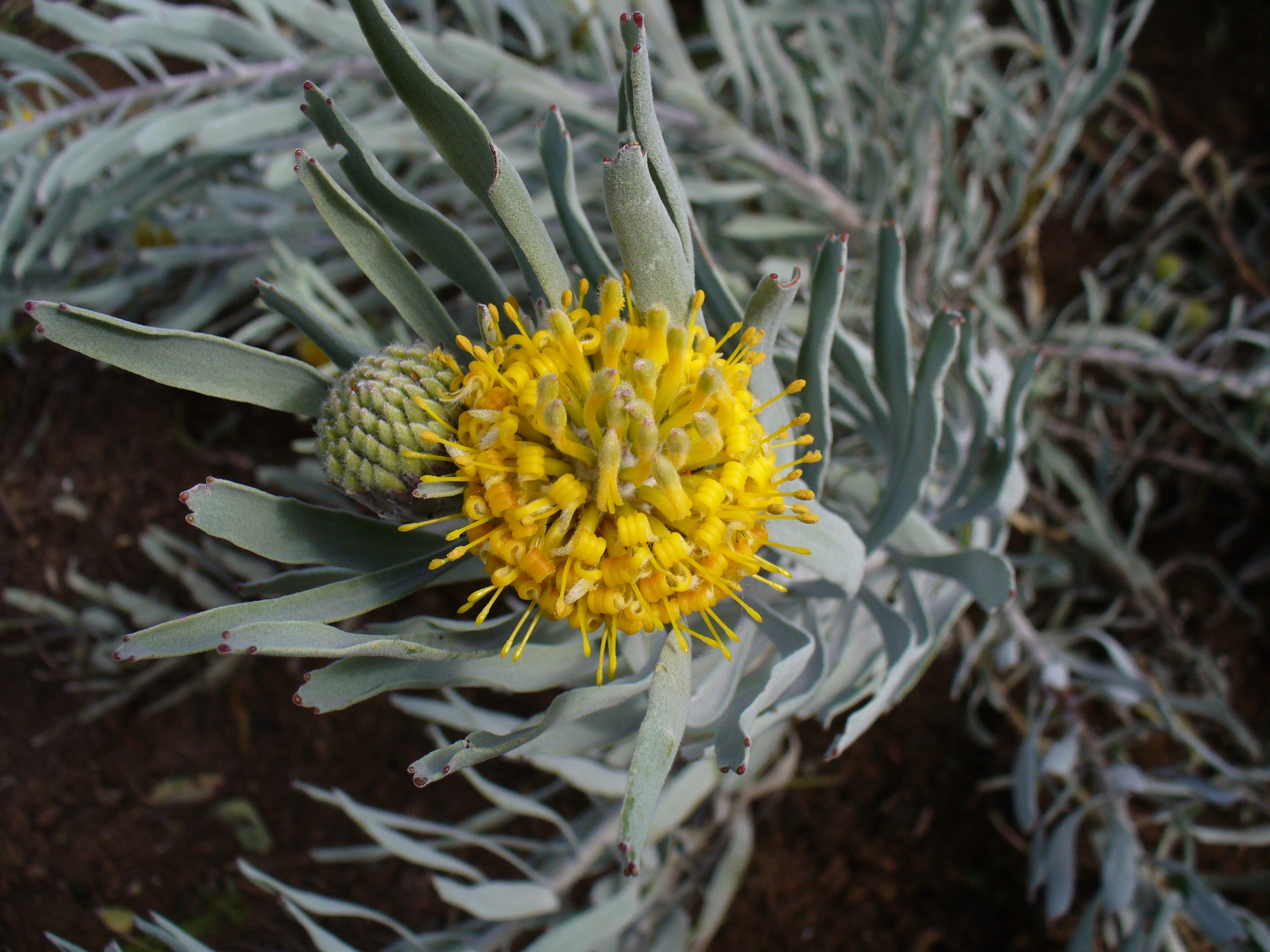

Conservation status
- Near Threatened (IUCN 3.1)

Scientific classification
- Kingdom: Plantae
- Clade: Embryophytes
- Clade: Tracheophytes
- Clade: Angiosperms
- Clade: Eudicots
- Order: Proteales
- Family: Proteaceae
- Genus: Leucospermum
- Species: L. tomentosum

Binomial name
- Leucospermum tomentosum (Thunb.) R.Br.

Synonyms
- Protea tomentosa, Leucadendrum tomentosum, Leucadendron tomentosum; Leucospermum ecklonii (nomen nudum)

= Leucospermum tomentosum =

Species of plant native to South Africa

Leucospermum tomentosum is an evergreen, mostly spreading shrublet of approximately 75 cm (2.46 ft) high and up to 3 m (9.8 ft) in diameter, with alternately set, linear or narrowly spade-shaped, grey felty leaves, with one to three teeth near the tip. It has round, seated flower heads of 3–3.5 cm (1.2–1.4 in) in diameter, occurring in groups of one to four, and consisting of deep yellow, very sweet scented flowers. It can survive the occasional wildfire because it regenerates from the underground rootstock. It is an endemic species that is restricted to a narrow strip along the Atlantic coast of the Western Cape province of South Africa. The species flowers between June and November. It is called Saldanha pincushion in English.

== Description ==
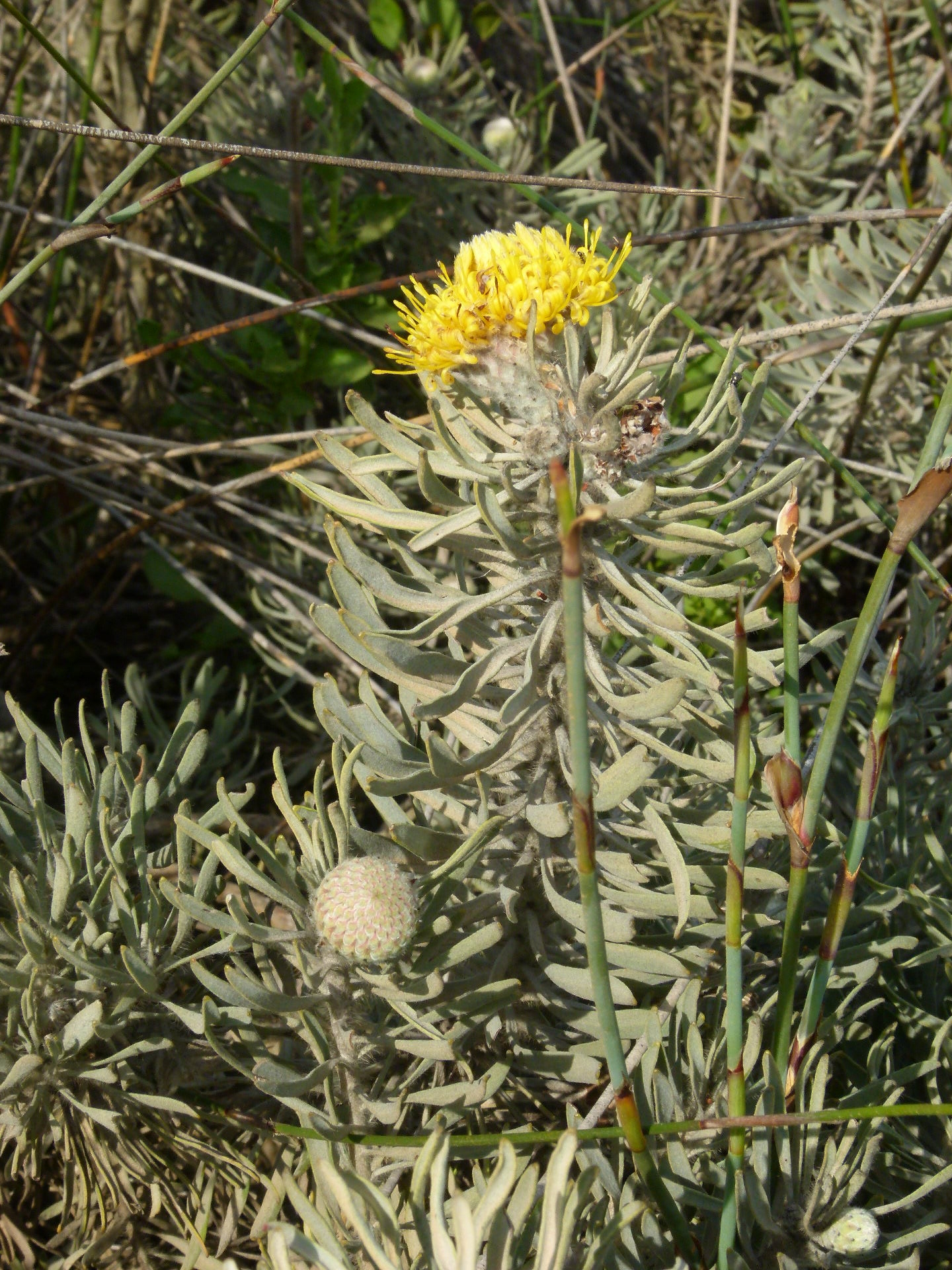
Side view

Leucodendron tomentosum is an evergreen shrublet of 0.4–1.0 m (1.3–3.3 ft) high and 0.5–3 m (1.7–10 ft) in diameter, initially with upright and spreading branches, that later are weighted down by their own growth and develop roots where they touch the sand, from which point new branches emerge. The underground rootstock is stout and covered in a thick layer of bark, providing additional protection against fire. The main branches are stout and woody, 2–5 cm (0.79–1.97 in) in diameter. The flowering stems are upright to erect to spreading, 4–6 mm (0.16–0.24 in) diameter, covered in dense, short, cringy, grey felty hairs, and some longer, thin, upright hairs. The grey felty, line-shaped leaves are 4.5–6 cm (1.8–2.4 in) long and 3–5 mm (0.12–0.20 in) wide, with no or up to three teeth at the tip, a gradually narrowing base, the edges curled inside, giving the leaves the shape of a tube segment, alternately set and somewhat directed upwards and overlapping higher up the branches.

The globe-shaped flower heads of 3–3.5 cm (1.2–1.4 in) in diameter, without stalks, are grouped with one to four together. The common base of the flowers in the same head are low cone-shaped, about 1.3 cm (0.51 in) long and 1 cm (0.39 in) wide, and is subtended by pointy lance-shaped bracts of about 5 mm (0.20 in) long and 3 mm (0.12 in) wide, cartilaginous, tightly adpressed overlapping and set with short soft hairs with a tuft of long grey hairs at the tip.

The bracts subtending the individual flower are line-shaped 5–7 mm (0.20–0.28 in), embracing it at the base, with a regular row of hairs along the edge, a pointy tip and the outer surface softly hairy. The 4-merous perianth is about 2 cm long, straight in bud, tube-shaped, entirely deep yellow. The lower part, that remains merged when the flower, called tube, is open, is 4–5 mm (0.16–0.20 in) long, hairless and somewhat flattened sideways. The middle part (or claws), where the perianth is split lengthwise, is 2–3 mm (0.079–0.118 in) long, with the segment facing the center of the head is hairless, while the other segments have very short hairs. It is hardly differentiated from the upper part (or limbs), which enclosed the pollen presenter in the bud, and is roughly hairy on the outside, losing hairs with age. From the centre of the perianth emerges a straight, slender, yellow style of 1.75–2 cm (0.69–0.79 in) long. The thickened part at the tip of the style called pollen presenter is cylinder-shaped or narrowly elliptic, 1.5–2 mm (0.06-0.08 in) long, with the groove that functions as the stigma across the very tip. The ovary is subtended by four opaque, line- to awl-shaped scales of about 1 mm (0.039 in) long. The flowers of Leucospermum tomentosum are sweetly scented.

The subtribe Proteinae, to which the genus Leucospermum has been assigned, consistently has a basic chromosome number of twelve (2n=24).

=== Differences with other species ===
L. tomentosum is the only species assigned to the section Leucospermum that has (some) upright branches and an underground rootstock. It can be distinguished from the other Leucospermum species by the combination of small, cartilaginous, tightly overlapping bracts subtending the flower heads with short, soft hair on the outer surface, and leaves line-shaped, gully-shaped in cross section. It can be confused with L. rodolentum that develops a single trunk at its base, L. parile that also develops a single trunk at its base and in addition has pointed involucral bracts and L. hypophyllocarpodendron subsp. canaliculatum, which shares that it has many stems from the ground, but differs in having rounded involucral bracts.

== Taxonomy ==
The Saldanha pincushion was first observed by Carl Peter Thunberg in 1771 at Jan Besis Kraal (currently Milnerton), who described it in 1781, and named it Protea tomentosa. Richard Anthony Salisbury assigned the Saldanha pincushion to the genus Leucadendrum in a book by Joseph Knight published in 1809 titled On the cultivation of the plants belonging to the natural order of Proteeae. When he erected the segregate genus Leucospermum in 1810, Robert Brown called the species Leucospermum tomentosum. Otto Kuntze in 1891 placed the species in his genus Leucadendron. In 1844, Heinrich Wilhelm Buek created the name Leucospermum ecklonii without a proper description, which John Patrick Rourke considered synonymous.

L. tomentosum has been assigned to the section Leucospermum. The species name tomentosum means "woolly".

== Distribution, habitat and ecology ==
The Saldanha pincushion occurs widely scattered along sandveld within 5 km (3.1 mi) of the Atlantic coast of South Africa, where it can be found between Bok Bay (near Atlantis, Western Cape) in the south and the sandy flat between Vredenburg and Hopefield, Western Cape. Just one isolated population near Mud River farm is about 10 km (6.2 mi) miles from the coast. Within its distribution, the average annual precipitation is 250–375 in (6,400–9,500 mm), almost entire falling during the southern winter. It grows individually in a very open vegetation in bare sand among other shrubs such as Metalasia, Passerina and large clumps of Restionaceae.

The species regenerates reasonably well from the underground rootstock after a fire, which naturally occurs in the strandveld and sand fynbos every other decade or so.

== Conservation ==
The Saldanha pincushion is still relatively common but declining because parts of its habitat have been converted for agriculture, and the remainder has been invaded by alien Acacia species. It is therefore considered vulnerable.
