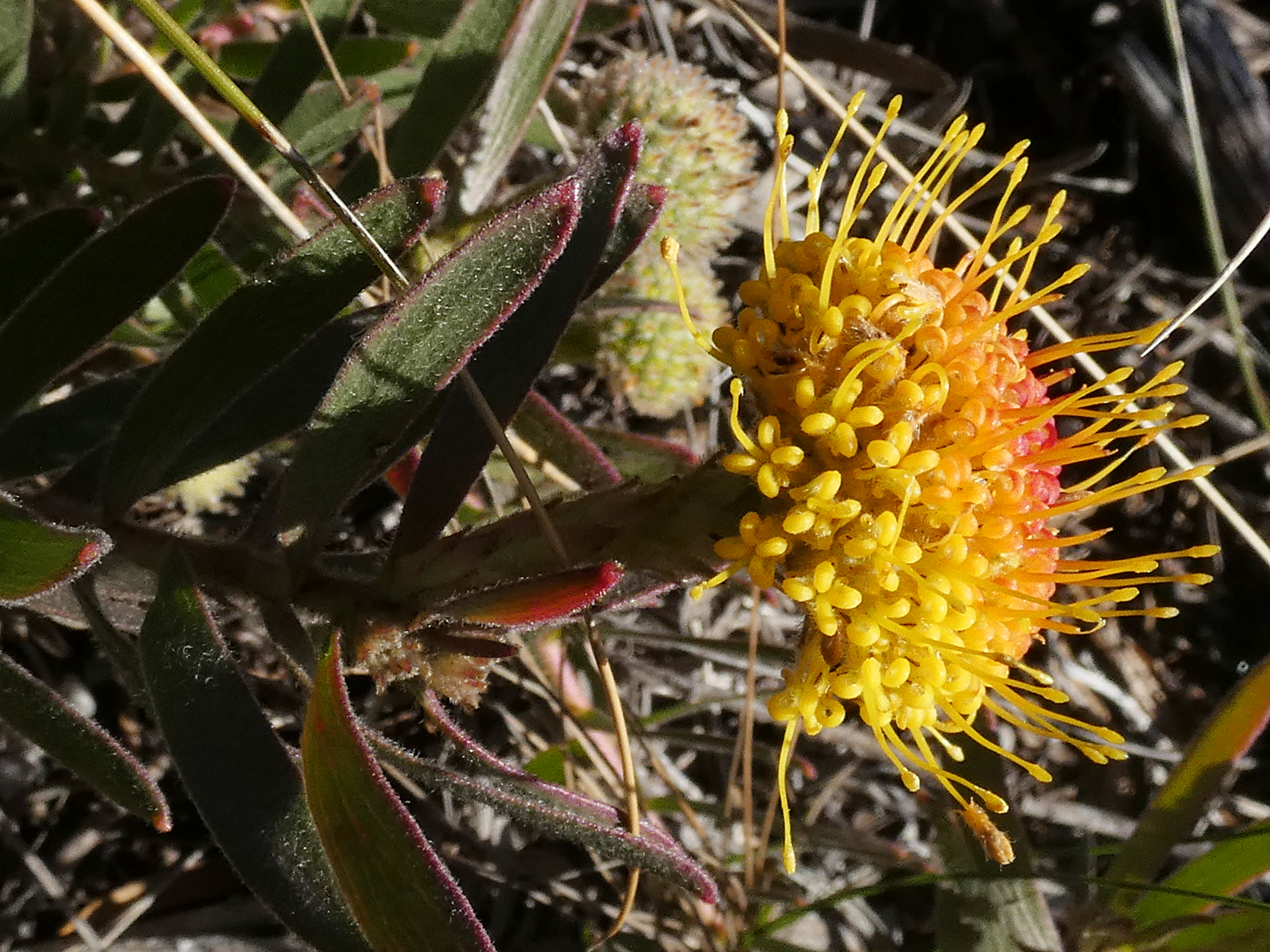

Conservation status
- Near Threatened (IUCN 3.1)

Scientific classification
- Kingdom: Plantae
- Clade: Embryophytes
- Clade: Tracheophytes
- Clade: Angiosperms
- Clade: Eudicots
- Order: Proteales
- Family: Proteaceae
- Genus: Leucospermum
- Species: L. prostratum

Binomial name
- Leucospermum prostratum (Thunb.) Stapf

Synonyms
- Protea prostrata, Leucadendron prostratum; Leucadendron glomiferum; Leucospermum diffusum

= Leucospermum prostratum =

Species of plant native to South Africa

Leucospermum prostratum is a trailing shrub of up to 4 m (13 ft) in diameter from the Proteaceae. It has alternately set, about 3 cm (1.2 in) long, lance-shaped, olive-colored, upright leaves, and produces sweetly scented, compact, hemispherical flower heads, with long styles sticking out far from the perianth tube, which jointly give the flower head the appearance of a pincushion. The fragrant flowers found between July and December are initially yellow but turn orange when older. It is an endemic species restricted to the south coast of the Western Cape province of South Africa. Its common name is yellow-trailing pincushion.

== Taxonomy ==
The yellow-trailing pincushion was first described by Carl Peter Thunberg in 1794 as Protea prostrata. In 1809, Joseph Knight published a book titled On the cultivation of the plants belonging to the natural order of Proteeae, that contained an extensive revision of the Proteaceae attributed to Richard Anthony Salisbury. He described Leucadendron glomiferum, based on another specimen than Thunberg's description. In 1856 Carl Meissner creating the new combination Leucadendron prostratum. He also recognised the name Leucospermum diffusum that Robert Brown had published in 1810 without a description, and provided the description. Otto Stapf assigned the plant in 1912 to the genus Leucospremum and made the new combination L. prostratum.

L. prostratum has been assigned to the section Diastelloidea. No hybrids have been found between L. pedunculatum and L. prostratum even when growing next to each other (in Kleyn Hagel Kraal near Pearly Beach).

The species name prostratum is a Latin word meaning "lying on the ground".

== Description ==
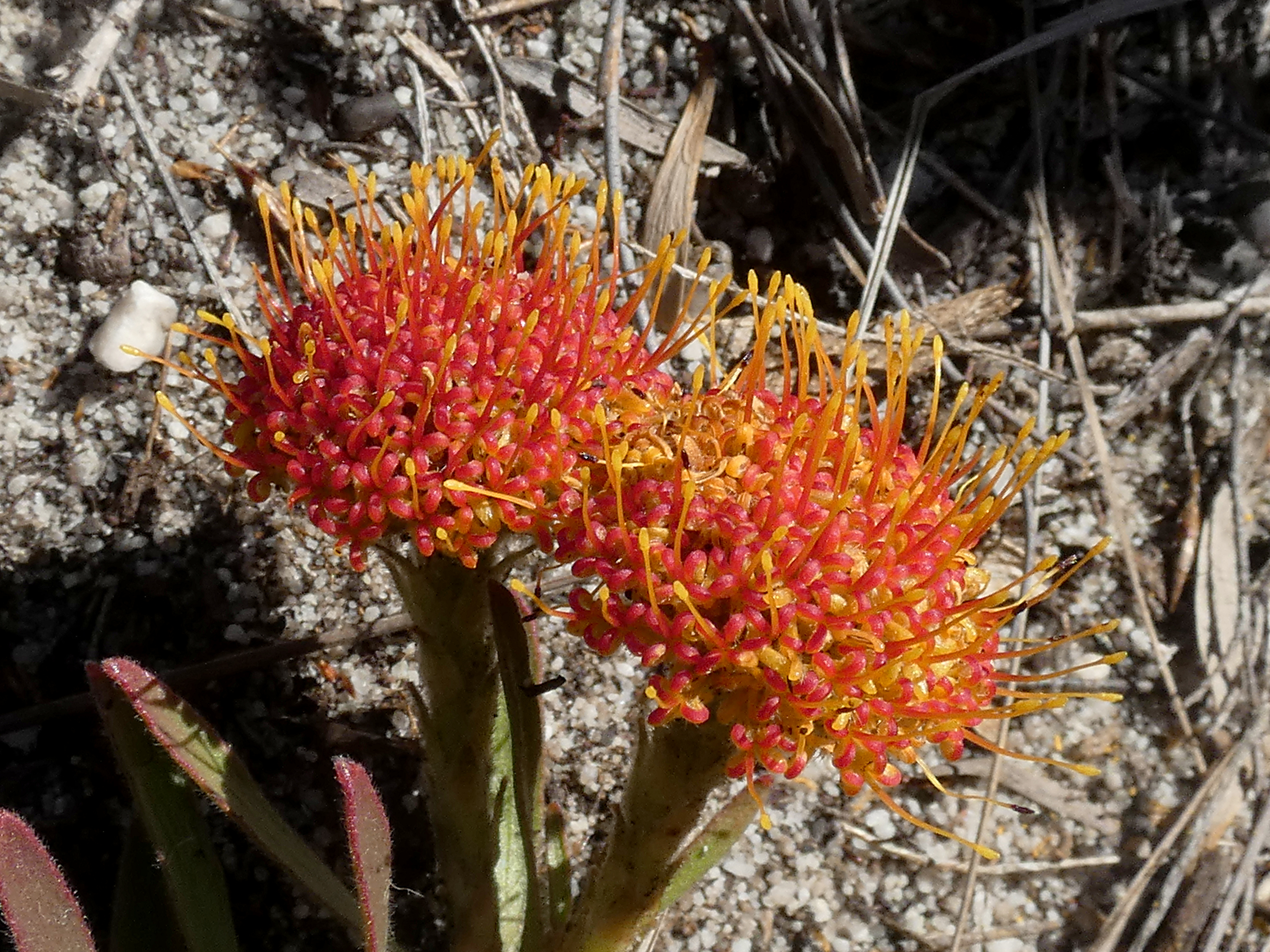
When aging, the flowers turn orange.

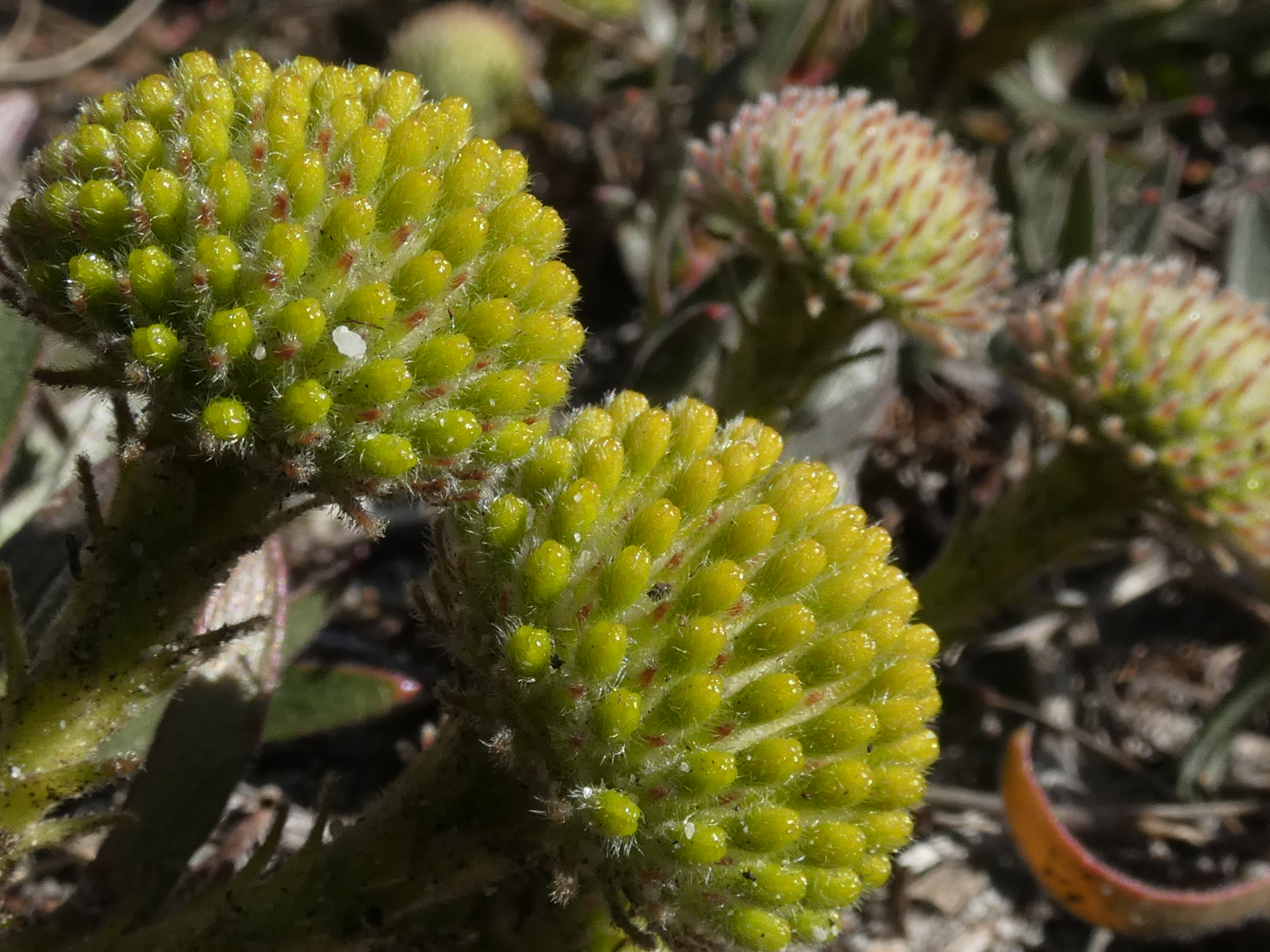
Buds subtended by floral bracts

L. prostratum is a low creeping shrub with trailing branches of up to 2 m (6.6 ft) long, with many originating from a woody underground rootstock. The flowering branches are straight, slender, about 2 mm (0.079 in) in diameter and covered in very short soft hairs and very shyly branching. The approximately erect, entire, linear leaves of 2–4 cm (0.79–1.57 in) long and 2–6 mm (0.079–0.236 in) wide have no leaf stalk or stipules at their base, with some short felty hairs that may get lost when aging have a dull olive-green color. The flower heads are many-flowered and compact, set individually, sometimes with two or three near the end of the branches, each on a 1–3 cm (0.39–1.18 in) long stalk, and is shaped like half of a globe of 2–2½ cm (0.8–1.0 in) in diameter. The common base of the flowers in the same head is 6 mm (0.24 in) in diameter, with a wide flat top (best seen in a flower head cut lengthwise in two equal halves). The bracts that subtend the head as a whole (called involucral bracts) are lance-shaped with a pointy tip 5–7 mm (0.20–0.28 in) long and 1–1½ mm (0.04–0.06 in) wide, overlapping, rubbery, softly hairy on the outer surface, with a tuft of hairs at the grey tip. The woolly bracts that subtend individual flowers are 7 mm (0.28 in) long and 2 mm (0.079 in) wide lance-shaped, the edges role inward and clasping the perianth. The perianth is 8–10 mm (0.31–0.39 in) long, straight, bright yellow when flowering starts by turning warm orange with age. The tube of the perianth is hairless, cylindric in shape and 3 mm (0.12 in) long. The four lobes of the perianth curl back on themselves and may be slightly hairy. The style is straight, 1–1½ cm (0.4–0.6 in) long, initially pale later becoming orange. The style is tipped by a blunt cylindric pollen presenter of 1 mm (0.039 in) long, with the stigma groove at the very tip. Subtending the ovary are four awl-shaped scales of 1 mm (0.039 in) long that produce nectar. The flowers of Leucospermum prostratum are sweetly scented.

=== Differences with related species ===
L. pedunculatum and L. prostratum look like each other. Both have trailing stems, ascending and entire leaves without teeth, perianth lobes that are free and curl back on themselves, straight or somewhat curved styles topped by cylindric pollen-presenters. L. pedunculatum has branches that originate from a crown atop the stout main trunk of up to 30 cm (12 in) high, creamy flowers that age to carmine pink, and a style of 1¾–2 cm (0.7-0.8 in) long. L. prostratum differs in having branches emerge from the ground, yellow flowers that age to orange and styles of 1–1½ cm (0.4–0.6 in) long. Although L. prostratum is not closely related, it can easily be mistaken for L. hypophyllocarpodendron that is also a trailing shrub with upright leaves and small yellow flower heads, but that species has leaves with three teeth with bony tips, and the perianth lobes do not separate, but remain attached. L. gracile is another trailing species with yellow flower heads fading to orange, but these are larger and have a flat top, as is best seen from the side.

== Distribution, habitat and ecology ==
The yellow-trailing pincushion can be found from the Kogelberg, along the southern coast from Pringle Bay to Franskraalstrand and inland to the Groenland Mountains in the west, Papies Vlei and the Elim hills in the east. It has a preference for sandy coastal flats and when it occurs in the hills, it is restricted to sandy patches of weathered Table Mountain Sandstone. Across its distribution, average winter precipitation is between 65–100 cm (26–39 in). L. prostratum survives even very intense and repeated wildfires that are natural to the fynbos, because it regenerates from the subterranean rootstock. The plants are pollinated by bees, butterflies and flies. The seeds are released from the flower heads about two months after flowering and are collected by ants that carry them to their underground nests. Chemicals released by fire have a positive effect on the germination of seeds of the yellow-trailing pincushion.

== Conservation ==
L. prostratum is regarded vulnerable because of a decreasing population, which is negatively impacted by direct competition from invasive species and habitat loss.
