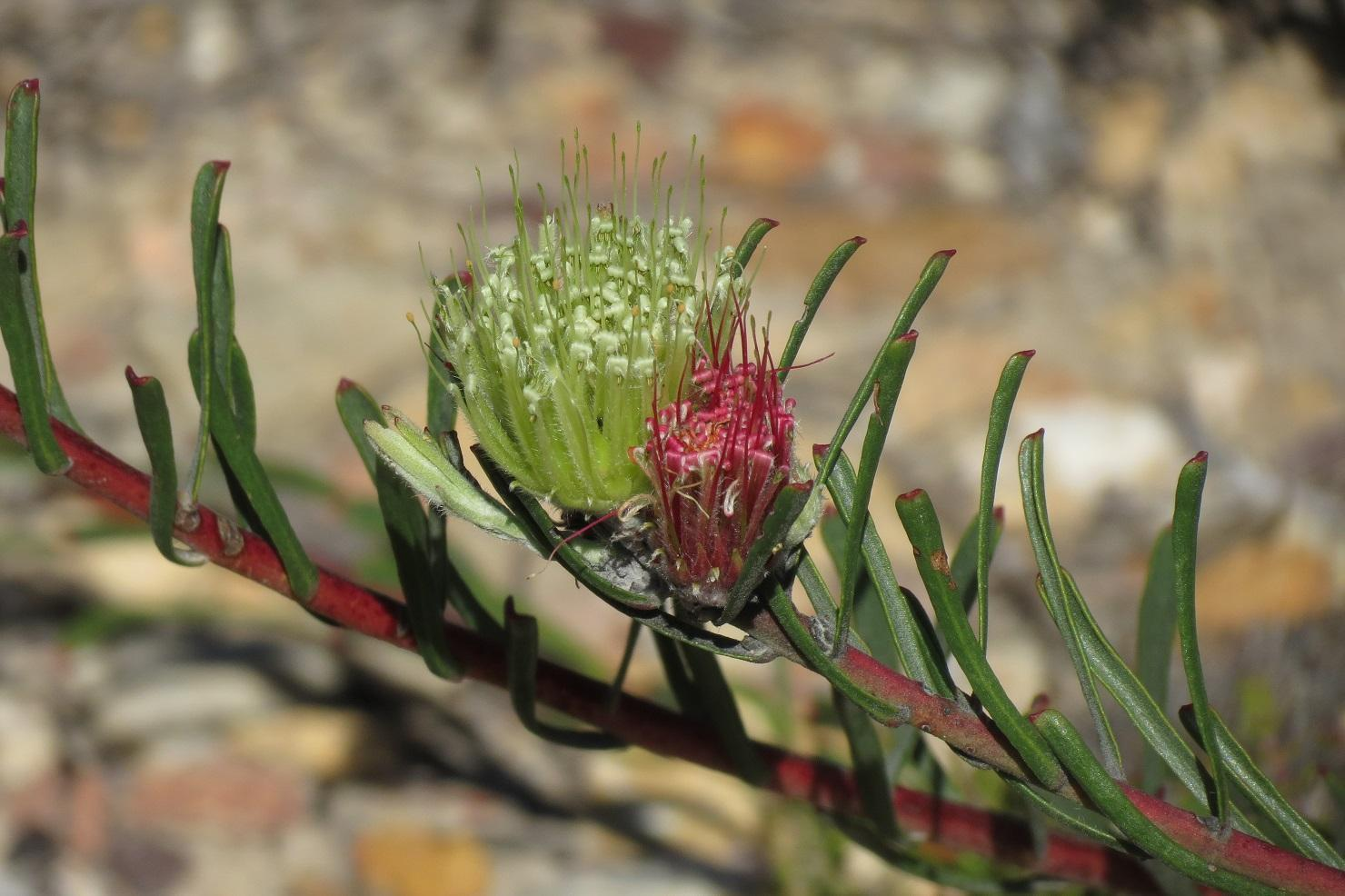

Conservation status
- Vulnerable (IUCN 3.1)

Scientific classification
- Kingdom: Plantae
- Clade: Embryophytes
- Clade: Tracheophytes
- Clade: Angiosperms
- Clade: Eudicots
- Order: Proteales
- Family: Proteaceae
- Genus: Leucospermum
- Species: L. saxatile

Binomial name
- Leucospermum saxatile (Salisb. ex Knight) Rourke

Synonyms
- Leucadendrum saxatile; Leucospermum diffusum

= Leucospermum saxatile =

Species of plant native to South Africa

Leucospermum saxatile is an evergreen, rising to sprawling shrub of 0.5–0.8 m (1.7–2.5 ft) high and 1–1.5 m (3.3–5 ft) wide, from the family Proteaceae. It has reddish tinged flowering stems and line-shaped, narrowing wedge-shaped leaves of 2.5–5 cm(1–2 in) long and 2–5 mm (0.08–0.20 in) wide, with one to three blunt teeth, whorl-shaped, flat-topped, at first pale lime green but later carmine flower heads of 2.5–3 cm (1–1.3 in) across, mostly individually but sometimes grouped with two or three, each on a stalk. The flower heads occur from July to October. From the flowers occur long styles with a slightly thicker tip, which together give the impression of a pincushion. It is called Karoo pincushion in English. Flowering heads can be found from July until February. It naturally occurs in fynbos in the Western Cape province of South Africa.

== Description ==
Leucospermum saxatile is a low, rising to sprawling shrub of 0.5–0.75 m (1.7–2.5 ft) high and 1–1.5 m (3.3–5 ft) wide. The reddish tinged flowering stems initially carry some soft hairs, which are soon lost, and are 2–4 mm (0.08–0.16 in) thick. The leaves are loosely pointing at an angle towards the tip of the stem, or are very rarely pointed upward, are line-shaped, narrowing wedge-shaped to the foot, 2.5–5 cm(1–2 in) long and 2–5 mm (0.08–0.20 in) wide, initially covered in powdery hairs, which are soon lost. The tip mostly has one thickened tooth, sometimes two or three and the margins often curl inwards.

The flower heads are whorl-shaped (or turbinate), 2.5–3 cm (1–1¼ in) across, usually set individually but occasionally grouped with two or three, each on a stalk of 0.5–1.5 cm (0.2–0.6 in) long. The common base of the flowers in the same head is flat, approximately 7 mm (0.28 in) across. The bracts that subtend the head are lance-shaped with a pointy or pointed tip, 0.5–1 cm (0.2–0.4 in) long and about 2 mm (0.08 in) wide, cartilaginous in consistency, softly hairy, and set in four overlapping whorls.

The bract that subtends each flower individually is densely silky hairy, with a regular row of equal-length hairs along the edge, lance-shaped with a pointy or pointed tip, 1¼–2.5 cm (0.5–0.6 in) long and 2–2.5 mm (0.08–0.10 in) wide. The straight 4-merous perianth is about 2 cm (0.8 in) long, initially pale lime green but later tinging carmine red. The lowest, fully merged, hairless part of the perianth, called tube is funnel-shaped and 5–6 mm (0.20–0.24 in) long. The middle part (or claws), where the perianth is split lengthwise is straight, consists of four thread-shaped sliky-hairy lobes, that curl back sharply near their tip. The upper part (or limbs), which enclosed the pollen presenter in the bud, consists of four silky-hairy, narrowly lance-shaped to linear lobes of about 2 mm (0.08 in) long. From the perianth emerges a thread-shaped style of about 3 cm (1.2 in) long, that tapers nearing the tip. The thickened part at the tip of the style called pollen presenter is bluntly cylinder-shaped, about 1 mm (0.04 in) long, and hard to distinguish from the style. The ovary is subtended by four awl-shaped, opaque scales of about 1 mm long.

The subtribe Proteinae, to which the genus Leucospermum has been assigned, consistently has a basic chromosome number of twelve (2n=24).

=== Differencies with related species ===
Leucospermum saxatile differs from is closest relatives by the narrow wedge-shaped to linear leaves, narrowed towards the foot, with the margins often curled inwards, the lance-shaped pointed bracteoles and the initially pale green perianth.

== Taxonomy ==
Richard Anthony Salisbury first described the Karoo pincushion and named it Leucadendrum saxatile in 1809, in a book by Joseph Knight in 1809 titled On the cultivation of the plants belonging to the natural order of Proteeae, that contained an extensive revision of the Proteaceae attributed to Salisbury. It is assumed that Salisbury had based his review on a draft he had been studying of a paper called On the natural order of plants called Proteaceae that Robert Brown was to publish in 1810. Brown however, called the species Leucospermum diffusum. Salisbury's names were ignored by botanists because of the alleged plagiarism in favour of those that Brown had created, and this was partly formalised in 1900 when Leucospermum was given priority over Leucadendrum. This was not done for the species names. John Patrick Rourke in 1967, realised both are synonymous and created the necessary new combination Leucospermum saxatile. L. saxatile has been assigned to the section Crinitae. The species name saxatile means "of the rocks".

== Distribution and ecology ==
Leucospermum saxatile only occurs in a narrow zone of so-called arid fynbos, along the northern slopes of the Langeberg near Riversdale district, fringing the renosterveld of the Little Karroo, from Rietvlei westwards to Muiskraal, a distance of just 30 km (20 mi), at an altitude of 450–600 m (1500–2000 ft). Locally dense stands either scramble over the neighboring shrubs or spread across the barren rock.
