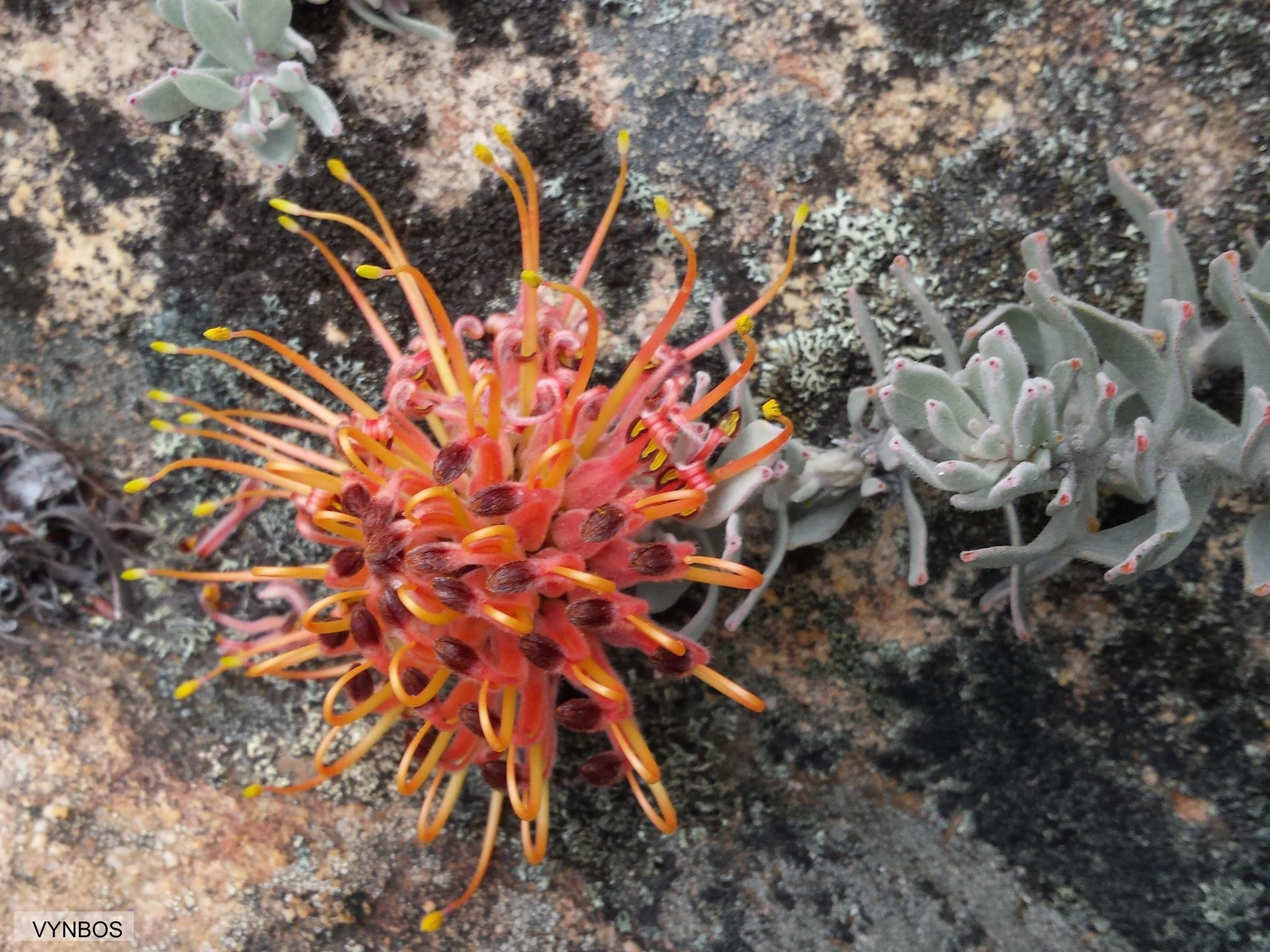

Conservation status
- Least Concern (IUCN 3.1)

Scientific classification
- Kingdom: Plantae
- Clade: Embryophytes
- Clade: Tracheophytes
- Clade: Angiosperms
- Clade: Eudicots
- Order: Proteales
- Family: Proteaceae
- Genus: Leucospermum
- Species: L. spathulatum

Binomial name
- Leucospermum spathulatum Rourke, 1970

Synonyms
- Protea spathulata, Leucadendron spathulatum; Leucospermum ceresis

= Leucospermum spathulatum =

Species of plant native to South Africa

Leucospermum spathulatum is an evergreen, spreading and mat-forming shrub, that has been assigned to the family Proteaceae. It has inverted egg-shaped to spade-shaped mostly greyish softly hairy leaves, mostly without teeth and flattened globe-shapec flower heads of 5–7 cm (2.0–2.8 in) across, consisting of deep orange to crimson flowers, the bud and the style curving toward the center. It can be found in the Western Cape province of South Africa. The common name in English is Cederberg pincushion. It flowers between September and January, with a peak at the end of October.

== Description ==
Leucospermum spathulatum is a creeping, mat-forming shrub of up to 3 m (10 ft) in diameter, seldom higher than 30 cm (1 ft) high. It grows from a single main stem that wedges between the rocks. The flowering stems are also trailing, 2–4 mm (0.08–0.16 in) thick, have short perpendicular side shoots and are covered in fine crisped hairs and some long straight hairs. The leaves are mostly greyish and covered in fine crisped hairs, but may eventually become hairless. They are inverted egg- to spade-shaped, 1½–3 cm (0.6–1.2 in) long and ¾–1¾ cm (0.3–0.7 in) wide, mostly with an entire tip, but sometimes with two or three teeth.

The flattened globe-shaped flowerheads of 5–7 cm (2.0–2.8 in) in diameter are seated or have a very short stalk of up to 1 cm (0.4 in) long, are set individually or grouped in pairs. The common base of the flowers in the same head is cone-shaped with a pointy tip, ¾–1 cm (0.3–0.4 in) long and ½–¾ cm (0.2–0.3 in) across. The bracts that subtend each flower head are greyish because they are covered with densely matted woolly hairs, tightly overlapping and pressed against the flower head, oval with a pointy to pointed tip, about ¾ cm (0.3 in) long and about 4 mm (0.16 in) wide, and cartilaginous in consistency.

The bract that subtends each flower individually is oval in shape with a pointed tip (acuminate), about 7 mm (0.28 in) long and 4 mm (0.16 in) wide, at the base very densely set with woolly hairs and enclosing the perianth. The 4-merous perianth is 3½–4 cm (1.4–1.6 in) long, strongly arches towards the center of the head, and deep orange to crimson in colour. The lowest, fully merged, part of the perianth, called tube is about 8 mm (0.32 in) long, narrow near the base but strongly expanded higher up. The middle part (or claws), where the perianth is split lengthwise and coils tightly when the flower opens, is covered in silky to villous hairs. The upper part (or limbs), which enclosed the pollen presenter in the bud consists of four oval-shaped lobes with a pointy tip of about 3 mm (0.12 in) long, which are covered in silky hairs. From the perianth emerges a style of 3–4 cm (1.2–1.6 in) long that is tapering towards the end, bent to the center of the head, and almost at a right angle in the upper third. The thickened part at the tip of the style called pollen presenter is narrowly cylinder-shaped with a pointy tip and about 2 mm (0.08 in) long, with a groove acting as the stigma slightly tilted to the center of the head. The ovary is subtended by four line-shaped scales of 3–4 mm (0.12–0.16 in) long.

The fruit is approximately elliptic, 9 mm (0.36 in) long, almost hairless and shining.

== Taxonomy ==
As far as we know, James Niven was the first to collect a specimen of the Cederberg pincushion for science, although the details of the location and time are unknown. Richard Anthony Salisbury in a book by Joseph Knight titled On the cultivation of the plants belonging to the natural order of Proteeae that was published in 1809, described it and called it Leucadendrum bellidifolium. In 1810, Robert Brown described Niven's specimen and called it Leucospermum spathulatum. These two were regarded synonymous by Edwin Percy Phillips and Otto Stapf. Because Salisbury did not indicate the type specimen, this cannot be confirmed and the description is not specific enough to rule out that L. bellidifolium is one of several other decumbent species, it cannot be used. Jean Louis Marie Poiret lumped Leucospermum with Protea in 1816, creating the new combination P. spathulata. Otto Kuntze reassigned it to the genus Leucadendron in 1891. Robert Harold Compton distinguished Leucospermum cereris. John Patrick Rourke considered all these names synonymous.

The species name spathulatum is Latin and means "spoon-shaped".

== Distribution, habitat and ecology ==
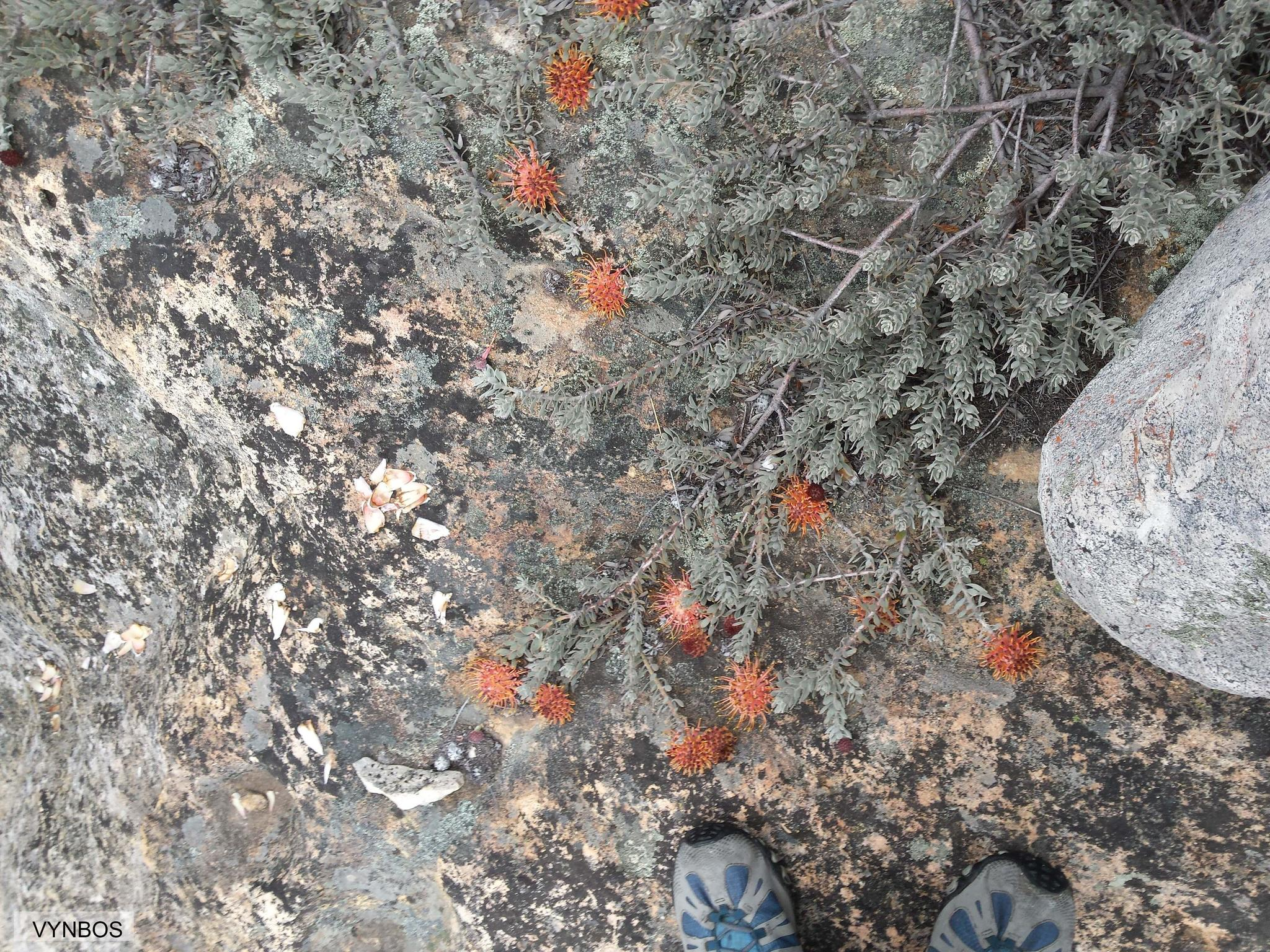
Habit

The Cederberg pincushion can be found from the Middelberg Plateau in the Cederberg Mountains in the north to the Kouebokkeveld Mountains in the south, and an isolated population on the Sawedge Peak near Worcester. It is most abundant in the Cederberg area, where it occurs on 1350–1700 m (4500–5500 ft) altitude. Here it grows on dry and exposed rocks of Table Mountain Sandstone, with an average annual precipitation of no more than 900 mm (35 in), mostly during the winter and some of it as snow. The plants root in crevices from which horizontal branches which spread creating a low shrub of up to 3 m (10 ft) in diameter.

Mature plants may develop into mats up to 3.0 m in diameter.

The flowers are pollinated by birds. After the fruits fall from the plants about two months after flowering, these are collected by native ants who transport them to their underground nests. Mature plants do not survive the wildfires that naturally occur in the fynbos the Cederberg pincushion lives, but it revives from the seeds that remained safe underground.

== Conservation ==
The Cederberg pincushion is considered a near-threatened species. Although it is currently not under thread, its subpopulations are mostly small and isolated, and climate models predict a serious decline.
