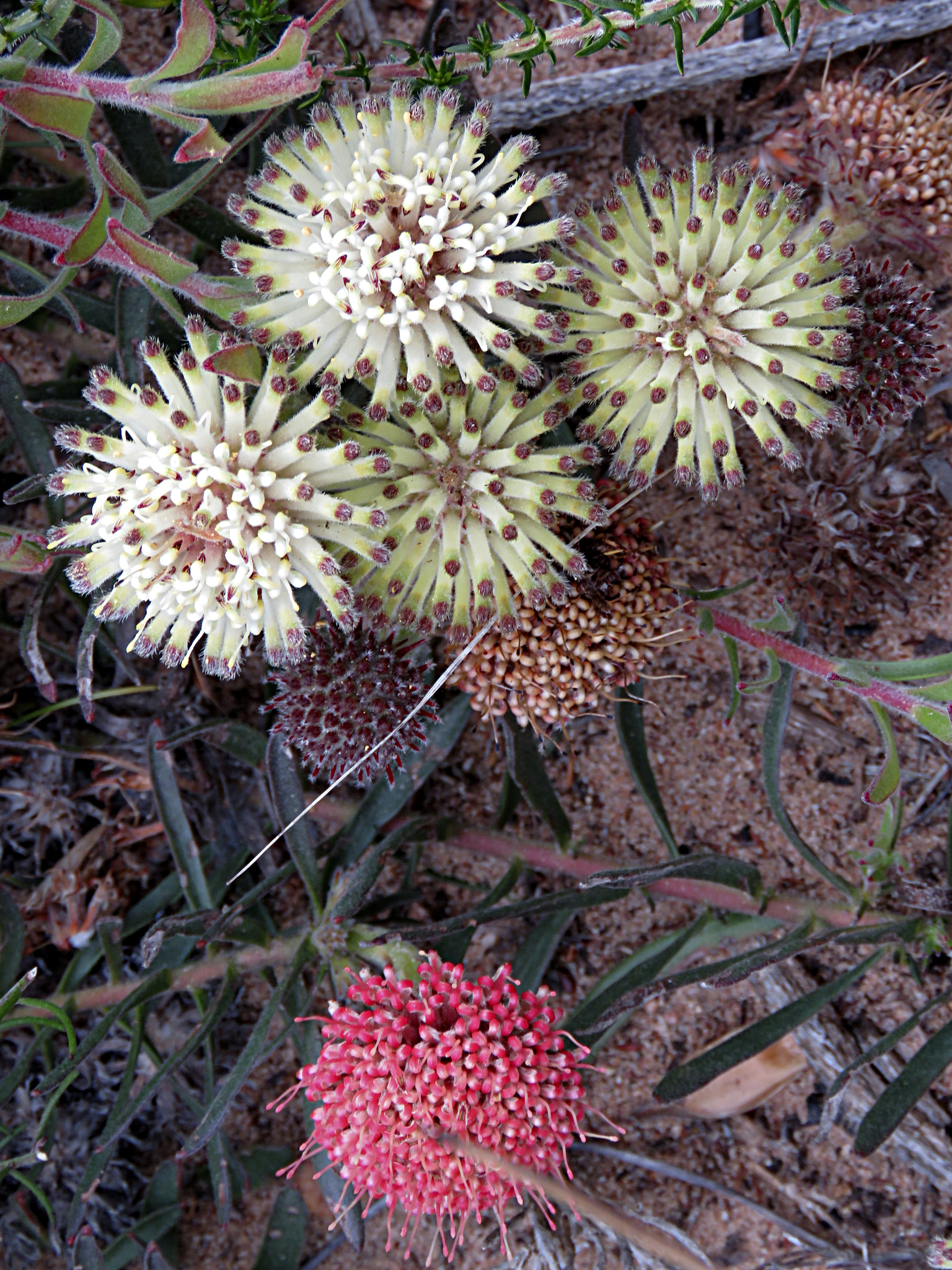

Conservation status
- Near Threatened (IUCN 3.1)

Scientific classification
- Kingdom: Plantae
- Clade: Embryophytes
- Clade: Tracheophytes
- Clade: Angiosperms
- Clade: Eudicots
- Order: Proteales
- Family: Proteaceae
- Genus: Leucospermum
- Species: L. pedunculatum

Binomial name
- Leucospermum pedunculatum Klotzsch in Krauss

Synonyms
- Leucadendron pedunculatum

= Leucospermum pedunculatum =

Species of plant native to South Africa

Leucospermum pedunculatum is an evergreen, low shrub of 15–30 cm (5.9–11.8 in) high, spreading from a single stern upright stem, from the family Proteaceae. The powdered or hairless, line-shaped to somewhat sickle-shaped leaves are 3–6 cm (1.2–2.4 in) long and 2–5 mm (0.08–0.20 in) wide. The stalked, individually set flower heads are globe-shaped, 2½−3 cm (1.0−1.2 in) in diameter consist of initially white to pale cream flowers that eventually turn carmine. From the center of the flowers emerge straight styles that jointly give the impression of a pincushion. It is called white-trailing pincushion in English. It flowers from August to January, peaking in September. It is an endemic species that is restricted to a narrow strip on the south coast of the Western Cape province of South Africa.

== Description ==
Leucospermum pedunculatum is a low spreading shrub of 15–30 cm (½–1 ft) high, that forms dense mats of up to 3 m (10 ft) in diameter, that grows from a single stout upright main stem, of up to about 30 cm (1 ft) high and 1–15 cm (0.4–6 in) in diameter. This gives rise to stout, horizontally spreading branches. The powdery, hairy flowering stems at the edge of the mat are slender, 2–3 mm (0.08–0.12 in) thick, and carry short side branches that each produce a flower head at their tip. The leaves are line-shaped, sometimes somewhat sickle-shaped, 3–6 cm (1.2–2.4 in) long and 2–5 mm (0.08–0.20 in) wide, hairless to very finely powdery, well spaced from each other, on trailing stems sometimes directed upwards. They are bright green in the west, and more olive-coloured in the east of their distribution, where it is also more upright.

The flower heads are globe-shaped, 2½−3 cm (1.0−1.2 in) in diameter, mostly set individually, with a prominent stalk peduncle of 2–4 cm (0.8–1.6 in) long. The common base of the flowers in the same head is very low conic, almost flat, about 4 mm (0.16 in) high and 7 mm (0.28 in) across. The bracts that subtend the flower head are lance-shaped with a pointy tip (or acuminate), about 6 mm (0.24 in) long and 1½ mm (0.06 in) wide, cartilaginous in consistency, set with straight hairs, rather loosely overlapping, and the tips slightly curved back.

The bract that subtends the individual flower is inverted lance-shaped, about 7 mm (0.28 in) long and 2 mm (0.079 in) wide, the tip is drawn to a point, the margins enclose the flower at the foot, and the outer surface is densely woolly hairy. The 4-merous perianth is straight, in bud cylinder-shaped, initially white to pale cream, but changing to carmine. The lower part with the lobes fused (called the tube) is about 7 mm (0.28 in) long, powdery higher up, but hairless and narrower at the base. The middle part, where all four lobes become free when the flower opens (called claws), is all equally recurved higher up and set with straight hairs. The higher part of the lobes (called limbs) is narrowly lance-shaped with a recurved, pointy tip, about 2 mm (0.079 in) long, and set on the outside with upright, stiff hairs. The style is straight, 1¾–2 cm long, initially pale cream, later becoming carmine coloured. The slightly thickened tip, called pollen presenter, is pointy cylinder-shaped, slightly cleft, about 1½ mm (0.06 in) long, with a groove that acts as the stigma across the very tip. Subtending the ovary are four opaque, line-shaped scales of about 1 mm (0.04 in) long.

The flowers of Leucospermum pedunculatum are sweetly scented.

=== Differences with related species ===
L. pedunculatum differs from Leucospermum prostratum by the stern, upright main stem of up to 30 cm (1 ft) high and 15 cm across, the horizontal branches that carry the flowering stems, on which short side branches that end in one flower head, the bright green leaves, and the creamy white (later carmine) flowers, with styles of 1¾–2 cm long. L. prostratum has branches that emerge from the ground, leaves initially greyish green but later dull olive-green, yellow flowers that age to orange and styles of 1–1½ cm long.

== Taxonomy ==
As far as we know, the white-trailing pincushion was first collected for science in 1838 by Johan Carl Krauss. Johann Friedrich Klotzsch described it in Krauss' book Beiträge zur Flora des Cap- und Natallandes [Contribution to the Flora of the lands of the Cape and Natal], which was published in 1845. Both Carl Meissner and Edwin Percy Phillips considered it to be synonymous with L. saxatile. In 1891, Otto Kuntze reassigned all known species of Leucospermum to the genus Leucadendron, a view that received little support from later authors. John Patrick Rourke confirmed the distinctness of the white-trailing pincushion.

L. pedunculatum has been assigned to the louse pincushions, section Diastelloidea.

The species name pedunculatum means "having an inflorescence stalk".

== Distribution, habitat, and ecology ==
L. pedunculatum occurs on the south coast of the Western Cape province in a narrow strip between Cape Agulhas (Springfonteyn) in the southeast and Danger Point (Franskraal) in the west, of at most 6½ km (4 mi) from the sea and 200 m (600 ft) altitude. It mostly grows on white sandy flats of Tertiary or Quaternary origin rimming the limestone ridges parallel to the sea. Although few plants are found on wind-blown sand accumulated between the limestone hills, they never grow on the limestone itself. At higher altitude, the species also grows on weathered Table Mountain Sandstone. The average annual precipitation along its distribution is 375–650 mm (15–25 in), which primarily falls during the winter half year.

The plants can survive the wildfires that naturally occur in the strandveld and fynbos it grows in, by regrowing from the main stem, but only if the fire is not too intense.

The white-trailing pincushion is pollinated by rodents, which may be attracted by its sweet, yeasty-smelling flowers that are great at attracting mice.

== Conservation ==
The white-trailing pincushion is considered to be a species of least concern because of its stable population.
