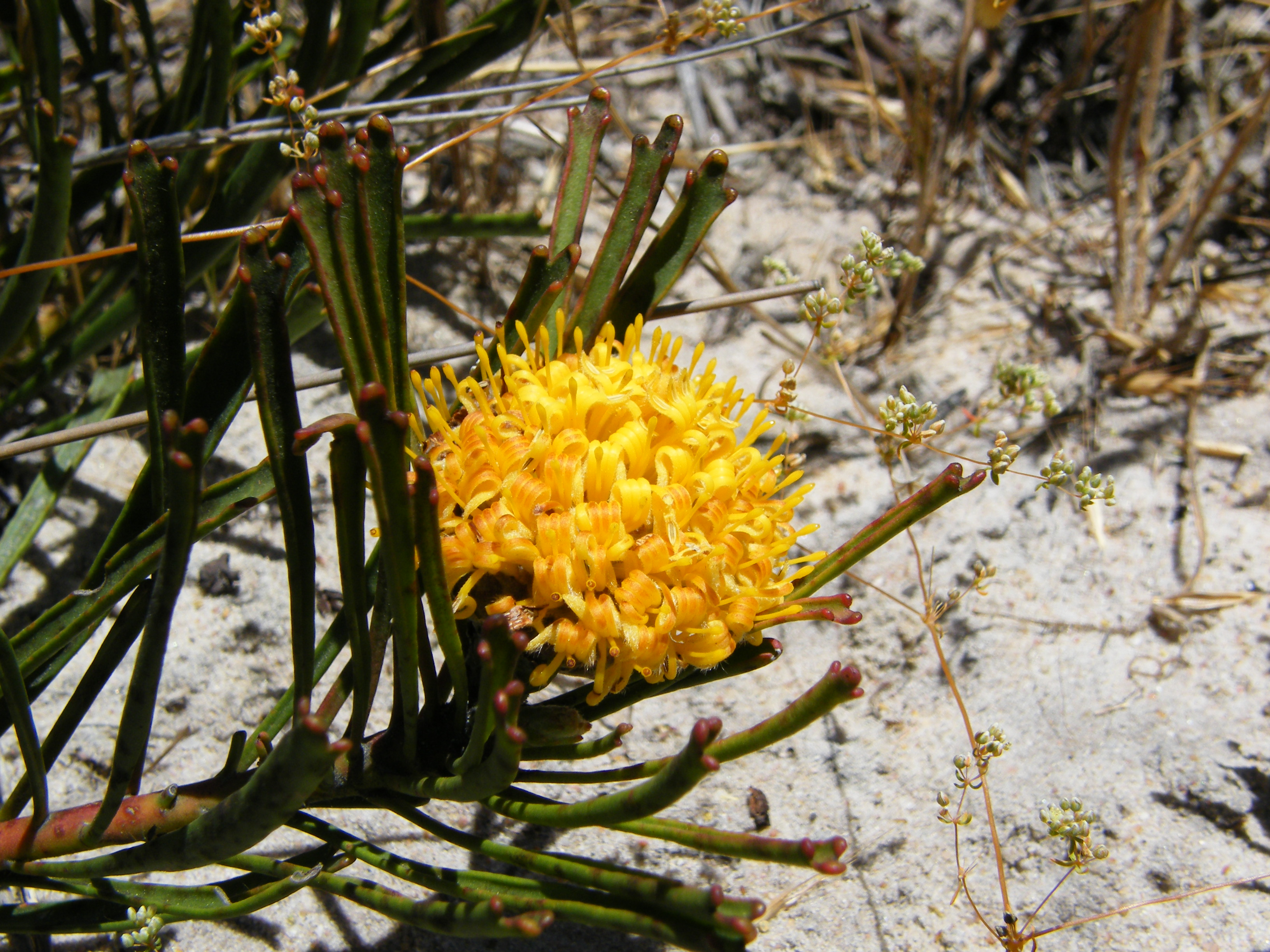
- Grey snakestem pincushion in the Koeberg Nature Reserve

Conservation status
- Endangered (IUCN 3.1)

Scientific classification
- Kingdom: Plantae
- Clade: Tracheophytes
- Clade: Angiosperms
- Clade: Eudicots
- Order: Proteales
- Family: Proteaceae
- Genus: Leucospermum
- Species: L. hypophyllocarpodendron

Binomial name
- Leucospermum hypophyllocarpodendron (L.) Druce

Subspecies
- subsp. hypophyllocarpodendron; subsp. canaliculatum
- Green snakestem pincushion (L. hypophyllocarpodendron subsp. hypophyllocarpodendron) Grey snakestem pincushion (L. hypophyllocarpodendron subsp. canaliculatum)
- Distribution of subsp. hypophyllocarpodendron in black and canaliculatum in blue.

Synonyms
- Leucadendron hypophyllocarpodendron, Protea hypophyllocarpodendron, P. hypophylla, Leucadendrum hypophyllum, Leucospermum hypophyllum

= Leucospermum hypophyllocarpodendron =

Species of shrub

Leucospermum hypophyllocarpodendron is a creeping, mat-forming shrub with heads of yellow flowers and leathery, upright narrow leaves with some red-tipped teeth at their tips, from the family Proteaceae. It has long thin branches that originate from an underground rootstock and grows on poor, sandy soils in southwestern South Africa. The rose-scented flower heads can be found for August to January and are visited by different monkey beetles, bees and flies. It has two subspecies, one with greyish leaves U-shaped in cross section called grey snakestem pincushion in English and gruisslangbossie in Afrikaans, the other with green leaves that are flat in cross-section called green snakestem pincushion and groenslangbossie.

== Description ==
Leucospermum hypophyllocarpodendron is a prostrate shrub (rarely rising up) of no more than 20 cm (7.9 in) high, with branches that spread out over the ground and form mats of 0.5–1.5} m (1.7–5 ft) in diameter. The branches originate from an underground rootstock. When the branches flower, they are 2–4 mm (0.079–0.157 in) in diameter and initially covered in fine grey crisped hairs, which wear off with age. Its leaves are upright, linear and U-shaped in cross section in one subspecies, narrowly lance-shaped with a narrow wedge-shaped foot in the other, 4–13 cm (1.6–5.1 in) long and up to 1.5 cm (0.6 in) wide, and mostly with two to four thickened teeth that are tinged red, in one subspecies initially with soft, grey, crisped hairs, which may partially wear off when aging, or almost hairless and bright green from the start in the other.

The flower heads occur in groups of up to four together mostly at a right angle to the branch, each on a 3–5 cm (1.2–2.0 in) long stalk, are somewhat flattened globular in shape, and 3–4 cm (1.2–1.6 in) in diameter, arising in groups of up to 4, generally upright. The common base of the flowers in the same head is cone-shaped with a pointy tip, 1.5 cm (0.6 in) high and ¾–1 cm (0.3–0.4 in) wide. The bracts are very broad oval in shape with a pointy tip 4–7 mm (0.16–0.28 in) long and 5–7 mm (0.20–0.28 in) wide, with or without some soft hairs, rubbery, overlapping and pressed against the underside of the flower head. The bracts that support each flower individually (called bracteoles) is rubbery, thickly woolly at the base and hairy higher up, wraps around the base of the flower, is oval with a pointy tip, about 7 mm (0.28 in) long and 5 mm (0.20 in) mm wide. The bright yellow perianth is 20–22 mm (0.79–0.87 in) long, tube-shaped, in the bud slightly bent towards the center of the flower head. The fused tube at the base is about 1 cm (0.39 in) long with very fine soft hair but hairless facing the center of the flower head. The three perianth lobes facing the center of the head together form a hairless sheath while the lobe facing the rim of the head is free, the sheath and free lobe strongly rolled when the flower has opened. The yellow style is slim, straight or a little bit bent towards the center of the head and 20–26 mm (0.79–1.02 in) long. The thickened part at the tip called pollen presenter is slightly split in two at the top, 1.5–2 mm (0.06–0.08 in) long, with the grove that functions as the stigma at the very tip. The ovary is subtended by four narrow awl-shaped scales of 1 mm (0.039 in) long, or may be absent. The flowers of Leucospermum hypophyllocarpodendron are sweetly scented.

The subtribe Proteinae, to which the genus Leucospermum has been assigned, consistently has a basic chromosome number of twelve (2n=24).

=== Subspecies ===
The snakestem pincushion has two subspecies.

Image	Subspecies	Common name	Description
	L. hypophyllocarpodendron subsp. hypophyllocarpodendron	green snakestem pincushion	The typical subspecies, characterised by flat narrowly lance-shaped leaves with a green appearance that are more or less hairless from the beginning.
	L. hypophyllocarpodendron subsp. canaliculatum	grey snakestem pincushion	linear to narrowly lance-shaped leaves that are U-shaped in cross-section that are initially grey because of a dense covering of fine, soft, crisped hair, some of which may wear off when aging, particularly where exposed.

=== Differences with other species ===
Although L. hypophyllocarpodendron is not closely related, it can easily be mistaken for L. prostratum that is also a trailing shrub with upright leaves and small yellow flower heads, but that species has entire, flat, lance-shaped leaves, and all four perianth lobes are free and roll back on themselves. L. hypophyllocarpodendron differs from its relatives of the section Leucospermum because it is the only one with a prostrate habit with trailing branches, with up-right leaves, sometimes U-shaped in cross-section, and broad involucral bracts.

== Taxonomy ==
The snakestem pincushion was described several times before the start of binomial nomenclature. In 1696, Leonard Plukenet, an early English botanist and gardener to Queen Mary, described it as: Leucadendros Africana sive Scolymocephalus, angustiori folio, apicibus tridentatis (African white tree with artichoke heads, narrow leaves with three teeth at the tip). Other early authors are John Ray (1704), Herman Boerhaave (1720), George Clifford III (1737), Adriaan van Royen (1740) and Johann Anton Weinmann (1745). The species was first validly described by Carl Linnaeus in his 1753 work Species Plantarum, as Leucadendron hypophyllocarpodendron, one of the longest names in that work. Linnaeus transferred the species to Protea in his Mantissa Plantarum. In 1781, Carl Peter Thunberg simplified Linnaeus' name and combined it to Protea hypophylla, which is a so-called superfluous name. Joseph Knight published a book in 1809 titled On the cultivation of the plants belonging to the natural order of Proteeae, that contained an extensive revision of the Proteaceae attributed to Richard Anthony Salisbury. Salisbury assigned the snakestem pincushion species Leucadendrum, accepting the simplified species name, creating Leucadendrum hypophyllum. When he erected the segregate genus Leucospermum in 1810, Robert Brown called the species Leucospermum hypophyllum; this is the type species of the genus Leucospermum. Under the current rules of plant nomenclature, the oldest specific epithet must be used; George Claridge Druce rectified this situation when he published the new combination Leucospermum hypophyllocarpodendron alongside dozens of similar cases in 1913.

In 1843, Heinrich Wilhelm Buek created the name Leucospermum canaliculatum without a proper description, but that was corrected by Carl Meissner in 1856, who regarded it as a variety of L. hypophyllum. Meisner also described Leucospermum hypophyllum var. stenophyllum in the same book by De Candolle in 1856. Johann Friedrich Klotzsch, a German pharmacist and botanist, in 1845 named a new variety Leucospermum hypophyllum var. angustifolium, also without a proper description. John Patrick Rourke considered in 1970 all of these grey-leaved forms with U-shaped cross-sections synonymous and created the new combination and subspecies L. hypophyllocarpodendron subsp. canaliculatum.

L. hypophyllocarpodendron is both the type species of the genus Leucospermum and the section Leucospermum. The species name hypophyllocarpodendron means "under-leaf fruit tree".

== Distribution, habitat and ecology ==
Leucospermum hypophyllocarpodendron subsp. hypophyllocarpodendron can be found in three isolated areas, that were probably at one time connected when the sea-level was lower than today. The first area is along the coast between Brandfontein (near Cape Agulhas) and Franskraalstrand. Another area where the subspecies grows is near Faure, Stellenbosch and around the Berg River Dam. Lastly, it occurs on the southern half of the Cape Peninsula. It also used to occur on the flat lands between Retreat and Cape Town, but is now extinct because of the city's expansion. The plants live in fynbos and strandveld on sandy flats below 150 m (500 ft) elevation, but sometimes grow on weathered Table Mountain Sandstone up to 300 m (1000 ft). Adult plants almost always survive the wildfires that occur every decade or two because they grow new branches from the woody underground rootstock.

Leucospermum hypophyllocarpodendron subsp. canaliculatum has its natural distribution along the west coast of the Western Cape, ranging from Milnerton in the south, to Darling in the west and Piketberg in the north, except for an isolated location near the Brandvlei Dam. It grows always on white sands in areas with an average annual rainfall of 38–50 cm (15–20 in), most of which falls during the winter. This subspecies is also very resistant against fire.
