= Koeberg Nature Reserve =

Nature reserve surrounding Koeberg Nuclear Power Station, South Africa

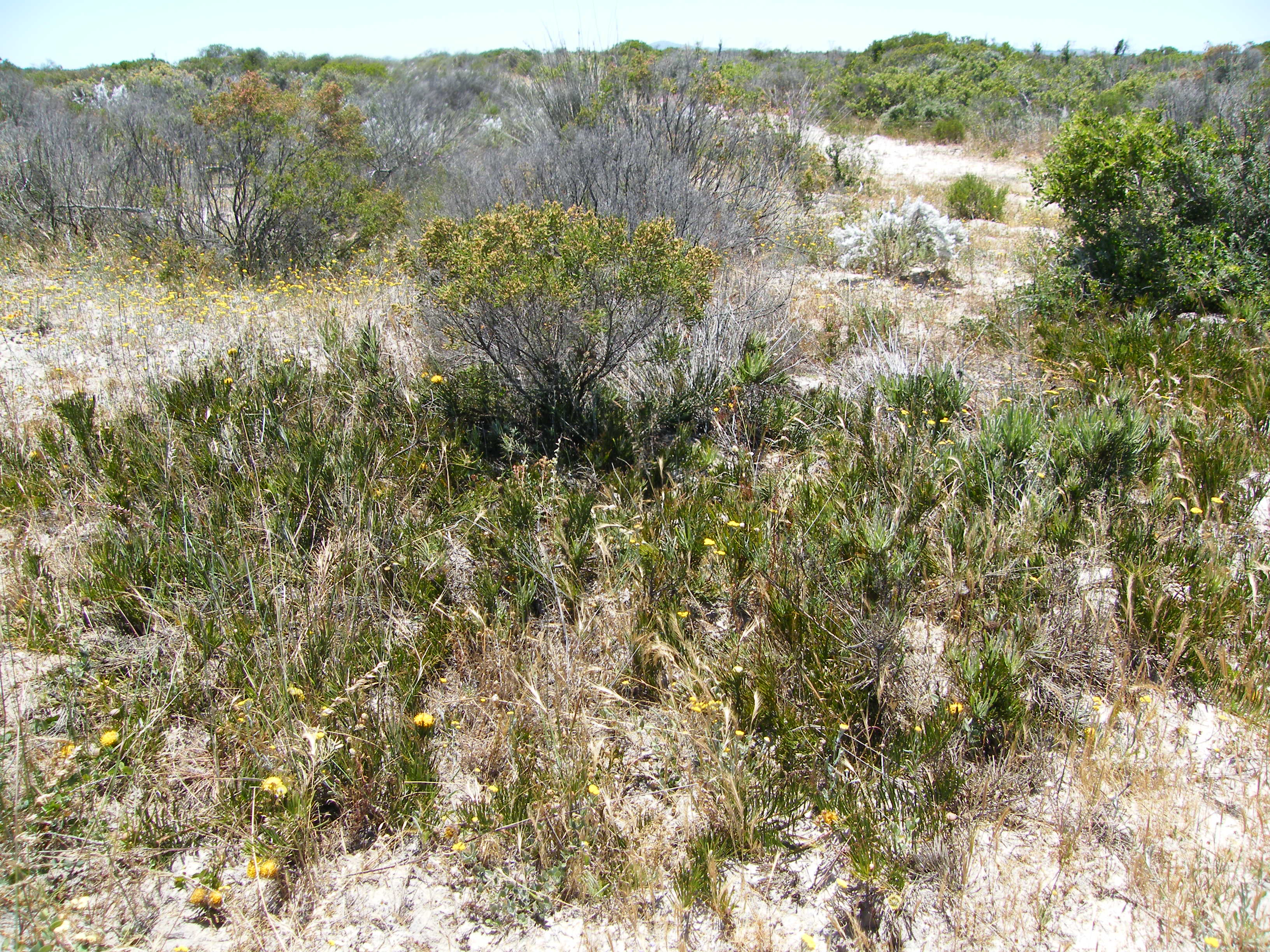
- Location of the park on the Western Cape coast
- Location: Western Cape, South Africa
- Nearest city: Cape Town
- Coordinates: 33°38′49.9″S 18°25′43.3″E
- Area: 26.81 km^{2} (10.35 sq mi)
- Established: 1991; 35 years ago
- Governing body: Eskom
- Website: Eskom - Koeberg Nature Reserve
- Koeberg Nature Reserve (South Africa) Koeberg Nature Reserve (Western Cape)

The Koeberg Nature Reserve is located in the Western Cape province of South Africa, about 30 kilometres north of Cape Town. The reserve was proclaimed in 1991 to create a buffer zone around the Koeberg Nuclear Power Station and protect the surrounding natural habitat. It is adjacent to the Witzands Aquifer Nature Reserve.

== Biodiversity ==
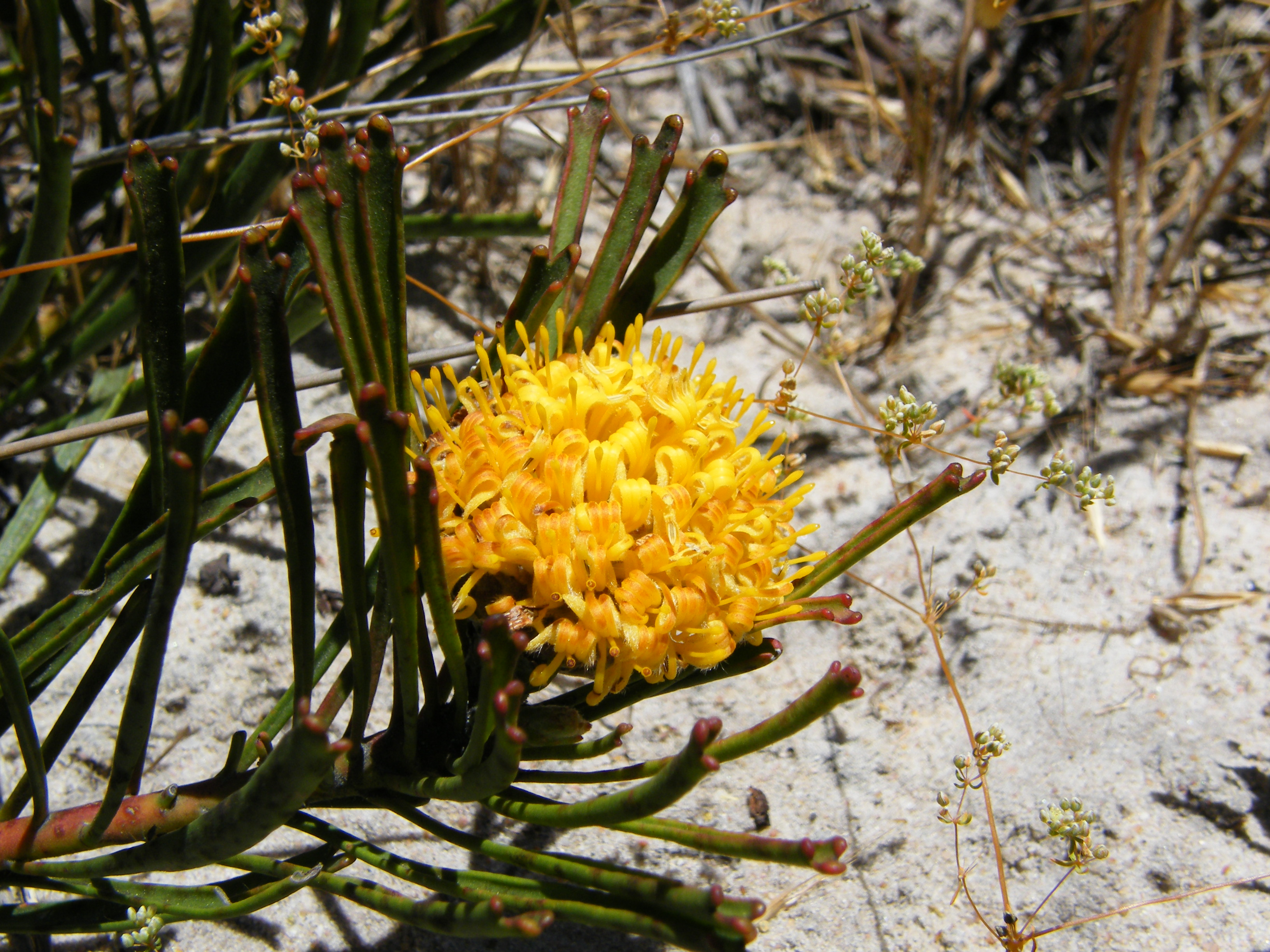
The endangered Grey snakestem pincushion.

The reserve is home to a variety of biomes including the endangered Cape Flats Dune Strandveld, Atlantis Sand Fynbos biomes. Different habitat types inside the reserve include wetlands, and two aquifers; the Primary Sandveld Aquifer and the Malmesbury Aquifer.

=== Amphibians ===
Eight species of amphibian have been found in the reserve.

=== Birds ===
There are more than 210 species of birds identified within the reserve. A selection of birds found within the reserve:

- Bar-throated apalis
- Bokmakierie
- Cape bulbul
- Cape bunting
- Cape robin-chat
- Karoo scrub robin
- Karoo prinia
- Southern double-collared sunbird
- Yellow canary

There are a number of threatened bird species found in the reserve:

==== Near Threatened species ====
- Great white pelican
- African oystercatcher

==== Endangered species ====
- Black harrier

==== Vulnerable species ====
- African penguin

=== Mammals ===
Mammal species found in the reserve are:

- African wildcat
- Bat-eared fox
- Blue wildebeest
- Burchell's zebra
- Cape grey mongoose
- Caracal
- Common eland
- Duiker
- Gemsbok
- Small-spotted Genet
- Southern right whale
- Springbok
- Steenbok

=== Reptiles ===
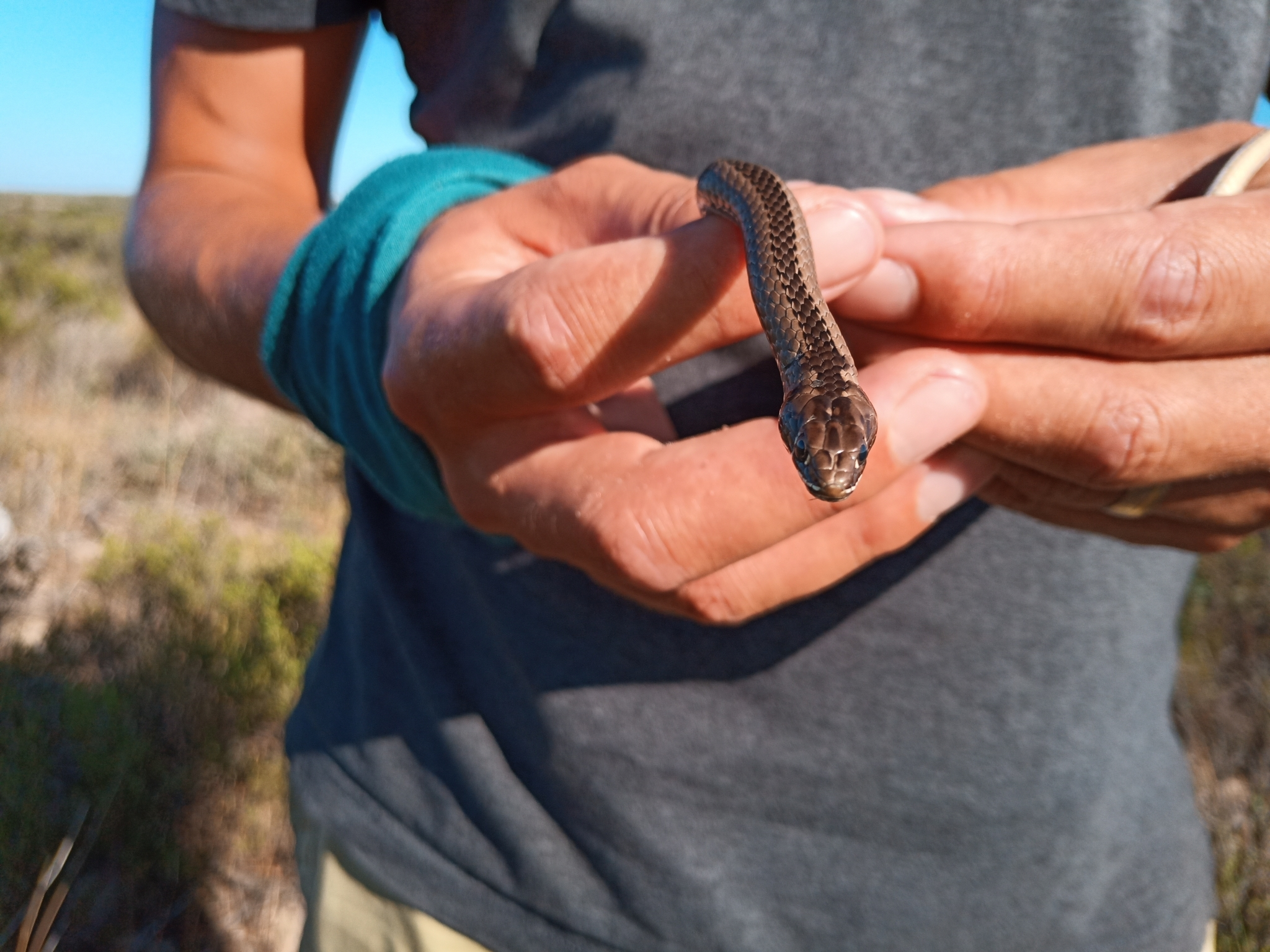
Cross-marked sand snake (Psammophis crucifer)

There are 40 species of reptiles found in the reserve, including threatened species Bloubergstrand dwarf burrowing skink, Gronovi's dwarf burrowing skink and the Southern adder. Most snakes found in the reserve are not dangerous, but two lethal species are also found; the Cape boomslang and Cape cobra.

- Cross-marked grass snake (Psammophis crucifer)
- Mole snake
- Rhombic Egg-eater
- Spotted harlequin snake
- Red-lipped herald
- Karoo sand snake (Psammophis notostictus)
- Spotted skaapsteker

== Activities ==
=== Trails ===
There are multiple length, signposted trails that traverse the reserve. The Dikkop Trail is a circular loop that ranges from 9.5 to 22.3 km. The smaller Grysbok Trail is a 5.7 km trail along the beach, past dunes and a salt pan.

=== Bird viewing ===
There are numerous bird hides situated alongside the dams within the reserve.

== See also ==
- Biodiversity of Cape Town
- List of nature reserves in Cape Town
- Atlantis Sand Fynbos
- Cape Flats Dune Strandveld
