= Striped harlequin snake =

Conservation status
- Near Threatened (IUCN 3.1)

Scientific classification
- Kingdom: Animalia
- Phylum: Chordata
- Class: Reptilia
- Order: Squamata
- Suborder: Serpentes
- Family: Atractaspididae
- Genus: Homoroselaps
- Species: H. dorsalis

Binomial name
- Homoroselaps dorsalis (Smith, 1849)

Species of snake

The striped harlequin snake (Homoroselaps dorsalis) is a species of snake in the family Atractaspididae. It is found in South Africa and Eswatini.
