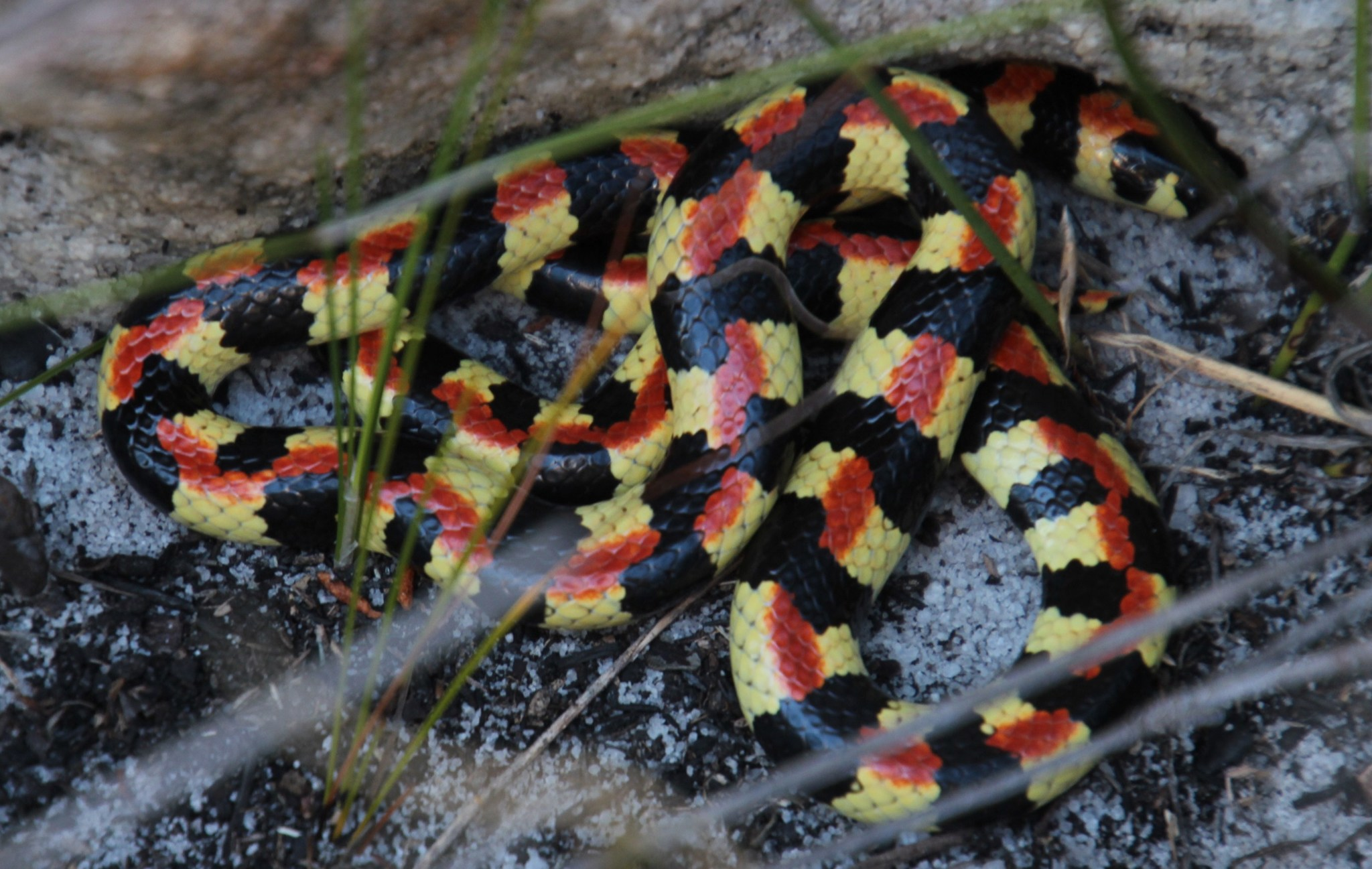
- Homoroselaps lacteus

Scientific classification
- Kingdom: Animalia
- Phylum: Chordata
- Class: Reptilia
- Order: Squamata
- Suborder: Serpentes
- Family: Atractaspididae
- Subfamily: Atractaspidinae
- Genus: Homoroselaps; Jan, 1858

Type species
- Elaps lacteus Linnaeus, 1758

= Homoroselaps =

Genus of snakes

Homoroselaps is a genus of mildly venomous snakes of the family Atractaspididae.

== Species ==
- Homoroselaps dorsalis (Smith, 1849) - striped harlequin snake, striped dwarf garter snake
- Homoroselaps lacteus (Linnaeus, 1758) - spotted harlequin snake
