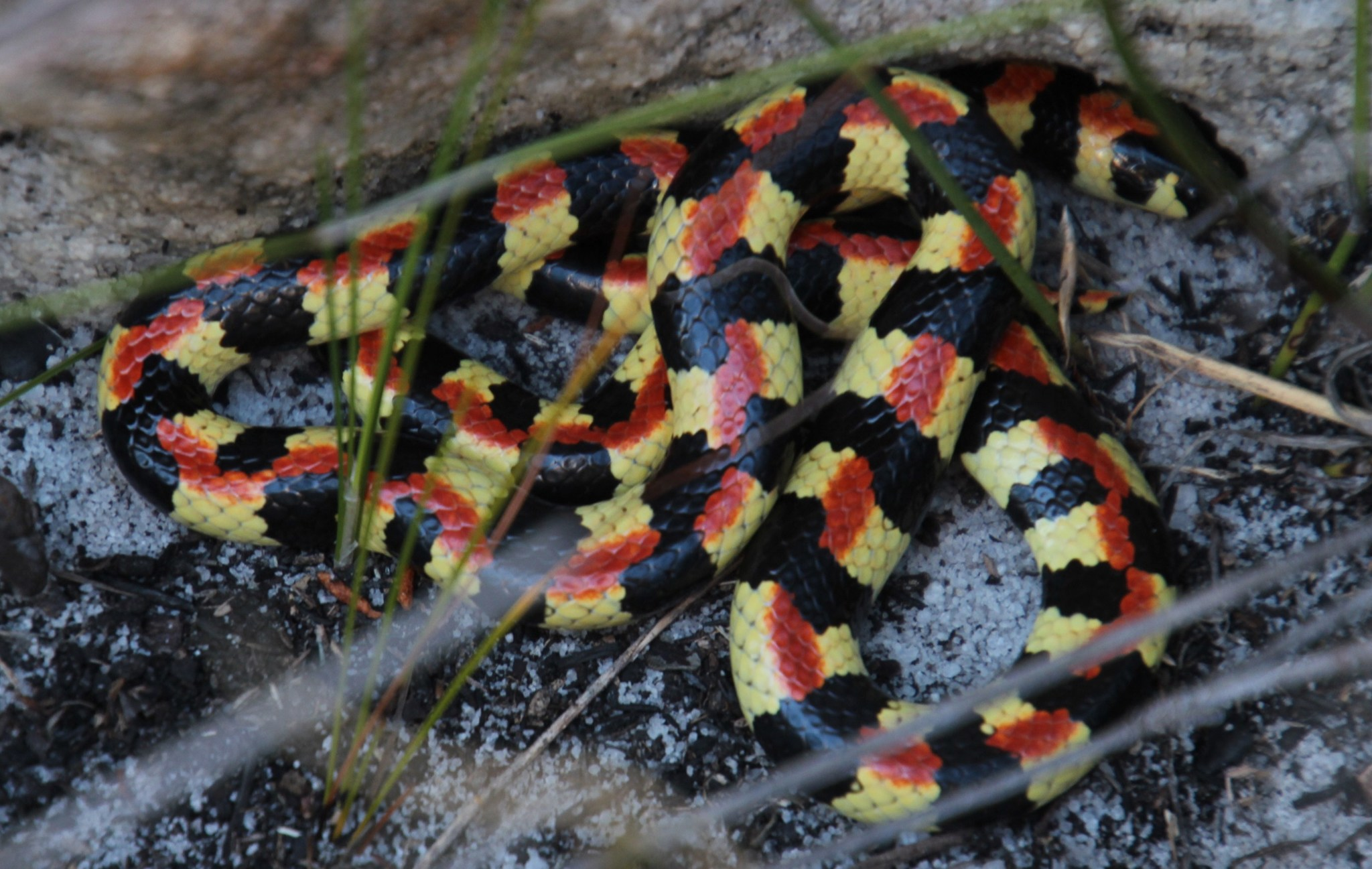

Conservation status
- Least Concern (IUCN 3.1)

Scientific classification
- Kingdom: Animalia
- Phylum: Chordata
- Class: Reptilia
- Order: Squamata
- Suborder: Serpentes
- Family: Atractaspididae
- Genus: Homoroselaps
- Species: H. lacteus

Binomial name
- Homoroselaps lacteus (Linnaeus, 1758)

= Homoroselaps lacteus =

Species of snake

Homoroselaps lacteus, also known as the spotted harlequin snake, is a species of atracaspidid snake. It is found in South Africa and Eswatini.
