= On the natural order of plants called Proteaceae =

1810 scientific paper by Robert Brown

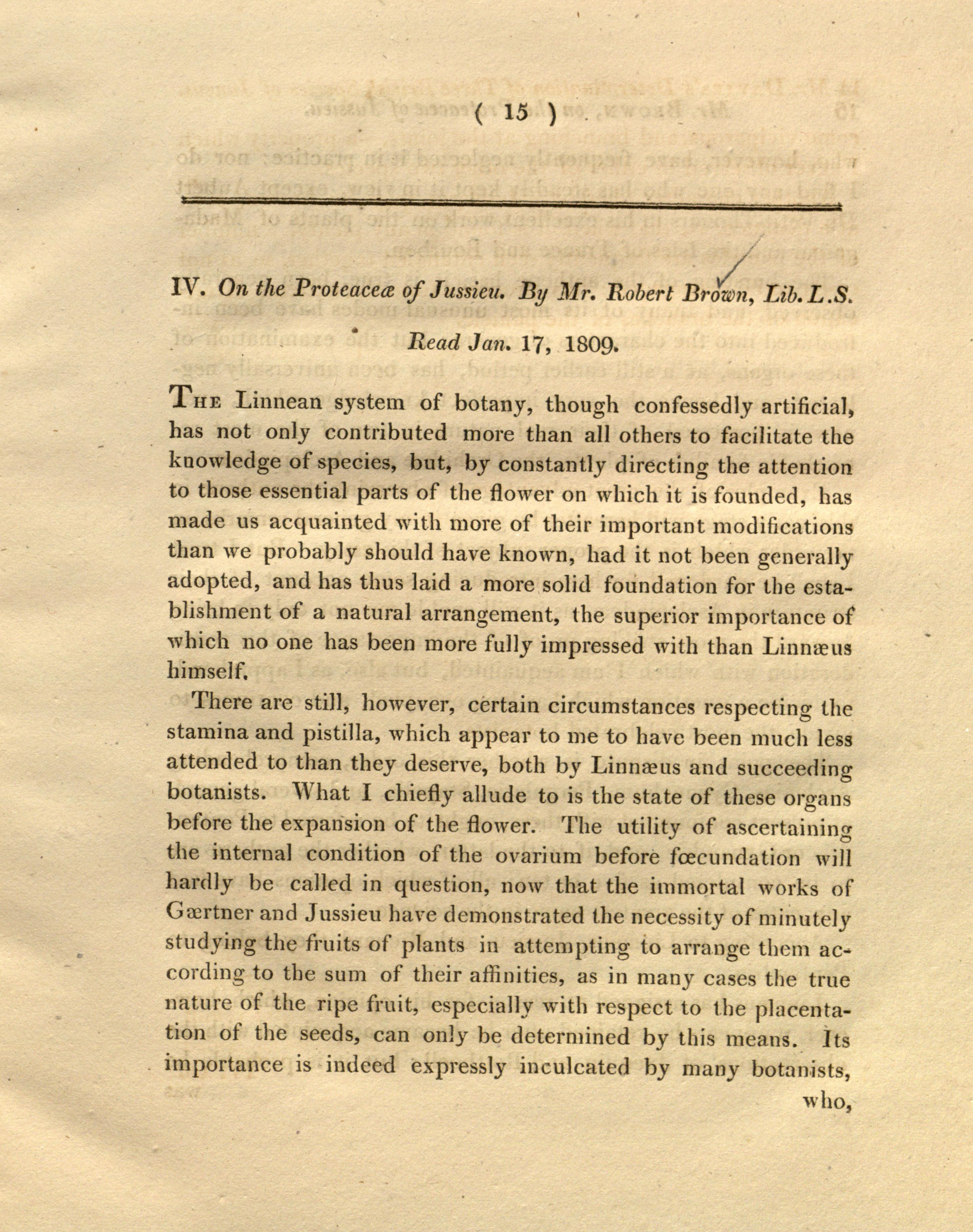
The first page of On the Proteaceae of Jussieu

"On the natural order of plants called Proteaceae", also published as "On the Proteaceae of Jussieu", was a paper written by Robert Brown on the taxonomy of the plant family Proteaceae. It was read to the Linnean Society of London in the first quarter of 1809, and published in March 1810. It is significant for its contribution to the systematics of Proteaceae, and to the floristics of Australia, and also for its application of palynology to systematics.

== Background ==
Brown had been botanist during Matthew Flinders' circumnavigation of Australia, and since returning in England in 1805 he had been preparing descriptions of the specimens collected during the voyage. Brown's intention was to publish a flora of Australia, but this was still incomplete in September 1808 when Jonas Dryander asked Brown to write a monograph on the Proteaceae so that Dryander could use Brown's names in a new edition of Hortus Kewensis. Brown immediately set to work researching the topic.

In preparing the paper, Brown had unfettered access to the herbarium of his patron, Sir Joseph Banks, which included the specimens he had collected during Flinders' voyage, and which contained the most extensive collection of Proteaceae in the world. He was also given access to James Edward Smith's Linnean collection; the herbarium of Aylmer Bourke Lambert; the living collections of George Hibbert; the herbarium of William Aiton, which contained the collections of Francis Masson; and the collections of William Roxburgh. In addition he was accorded a brief examination of the specimens collected by Jacques Labillardière at Esperance Bay, on the southwest coast of Australia, where Brown had not collected.

== Content ==
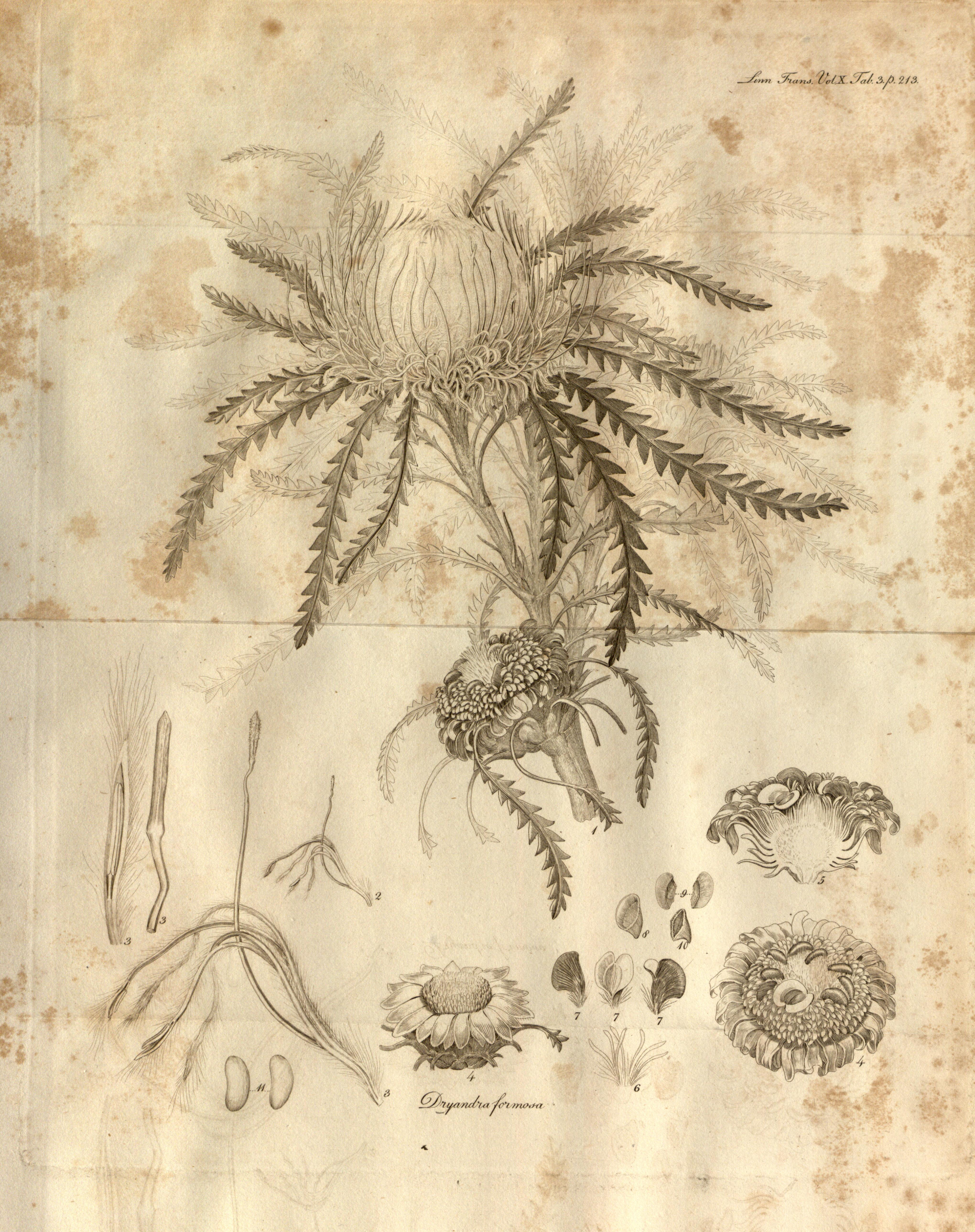
Plate 3, depicting Dryandra formosa (now Banksia formosa)

Brown's paper was read to the Linnean Society of London in four parts, on 17 January, 7 February, 21 February and 7 March 1809. The Council of the Society approved it for publication on 2 May, but it did not appear in print until 8 March 1810. It was published as a separate offprint under the title On the natural order of plants called Proteaceae, and then appeared in Volume 10, Part 1 of Transactions of the Linnean Society of London, under the title On the Proteaceae of Jussieu. It was illustrated by two Ferdinand Bauer plates, depicting Knightia excelsa and Dryandra formosa (now Banksia formosa).

The paper begins with a digression, presenting Brown's observations on undeveloped Asclepiadaceae flowers as evidence of the importance of studying developing flowers as well as mature ones. It then discusses the biogeography of Proteaceae, noting the Southern Hemisphere (that is, Gondwanan) distribution of the family, and that "[t]he most numerous genera are also the most widely diffused." Brown then discusses the morphology of the family, including a discussion of pollen shape; according to David Mabberley this represents "the first major study of the subject, palynology".

The systematics section follows, and is most important for the large number of new taxa published therein. 404 species in 38 genera are listed. 18 of the genera are new, and nearly all of these are still upheld. The arrangement of these genera largely follows that introduced by Richard Salisbury in his 1806 The Paradisus Londinensis, although Brown asserts that he arrived at his arrangement independently. Brown does introduce one important concept, however: his division of the Proteaceae into two subfamilies based on whether or not the fruit dehisces. This is still considered the fundamental division in the family, though opinion has varied on whether the defining character should be fruit dehiscence or paired flowers.

Overall, the paper was very well received; according to Mabberley, "[t]he paper was masterful and commanded respect for Brown as a brilliant botanist."

== Controversy ==
Shortly after the reading of "On the natural order of plants called Proteaceae", but before it appeared in print, there appeared a publication that started one of the most bitter disputes in 19th century botany. This was On the cultivation of the plants belonging to the natural order of Proteeae, ostensibly by Joseph Knight. Despite the title, this paper contained only 13 pages related to cultivation techniques, but over 100 pages of taxonomic revision. Although not explicitly attributed, it was widely believed, and is still so, that this revision was contributed by Richard Salisbury, who had been present at all four of the meetings at which Brown read his paper. The revision contains many of the plant names that Brown had presented to the Linnean Society; for example, the genera Petrophile, Isopogon and Grevillea. Thus Salisbury beat Brown to print, claiming priority for the names that Brown had authored. Salisbury is also accused of having appropriated some of Brown's observations; for example, in the Linnean Society copy of Knight's paper, where Salisbury says that he suspects that the fruit of Persoonia is unusual, Brown has pencilled in "He suspects it because he listened very attentively to my paper when read at the Linnean Society."

Salisbury was accused of plagiarism and ostracised from botanical circles. Contemporary notes and letters indicate widespread condemnation of Salisbury's actions. For example, Samuel Goodenough wrote "How shocked was I to see Salisbury's surreptitious anticipation of Brown's paper on new Holland plants, under the name and disguise of Mr. Hibbert's gardener! Oh it is too bad!"; and James Edward Smith wrote that he had a copy of Knight's paper "but shall not keep it—I mean hereafter not to notice it or any other of the author's productions." Brown himself wrote of Salisbury "I scarcely know what to think of him except that he stands between a rogue and a fool."

With the passage of time, some dissenting views have emerged. In 1870, Charles Babbington wrote that "Knight's Proteaceae is very curious if the best part of it was really carried away from a Linnean meeting and appropriated by Salisbury to tease R. Brown"; and other authors have since denied Salisbury's involvement. In 1886, James Britten noted that Smith had earlier deliberately acted to suppress a genus name published by Salisbury, and that there was an understanding among botanical leaders of the period, including Brown, Banks and Smith, that Salisbury's names should be ignored, partly because Salisbury supported de Jussieu's natural system of classification rather than the sexual system of Linnaeus. In 1985 David Mabberley offered the following in Salisbury's defence: "If Salisbury was guilty, why did he do it? ... [N]o doubt Salisbury felt that Brown was encroaching on his territory, for he had been writing on, and studying, Proteaceae for some time, and here was the Librarian of Smith's Linnean Society dashing off a paper to get his names into Hortus kewensis, criticizing Salisbury and abandoning some of his names on the way. It seems not inconceivable, therefore, that Salisbury... would have made amendments to Knight's final manuscript in the light of Brown's remarks... and hurried it through the press to defeat the machinations of his enemy."

== Publication history ==
This paper has seen a number of republications. In total it has been published four times:

- Brown, Robert (1810). On the natural order of plants called Proteaceae.
- Brown, Robert (1810). "On the Proteaceae of Jussieu". Transactions of the Linnean Society of London. 10 (1): 15–226. doi:10.1111/j.1096-3642.1810.tb00013.x.
- Nees von Esenbeck, C. G. D., ed. (1827). "On the Proteaceae of Jussieu". Robert Brown's Vermischte botanische Schiften. Vol. 2. pp. 53–346.
- J. J. Bennett, ed. (1866–68). "On the Proteaceae of Jussieu". The Miscellaneous Botanical Works of Robert Brown, Esq., D.C.L., F.R.S. Vol. 2. pp. 3–192.
