= Joseph Knight (horticulturist) =

English horticulturist (1778–1855)

Joseph Knight (7 October 1778 – 20 July 1855), gardener to George Hibbert, was one of the first people in England to successfully propagate Proteaceae. He is remembered as the nominal author of a publication that caused one of the biggest controversies of 19th-century English botany.

== Career ==
Born in Brindle, Lancashire, he became head gardener to George Hibbert, who was an enthusiastic amateur botanist. Hibbert became caught up in the craze for cultivating Proteaceae, and as a result Knight became adept at their cultivation and propagation. He eventually set himself to write a book on their cultivation, which would be published in 1809 under the title On the cultivation of the plants belonging to the natural order of Proteeae. Despite the title, this book contained only 13 pages related to cultivation techniques, but over 100 pages of taxonomic revision. Although not explicitly attributed, this 100 page revision is known to have been contributed by Richard Salisbury. In it, Salisbury published for the first time many plant names that he had memorised from Robert Brown's reading of his On the Proteaceae of Jussieu to the Linnean Society of London in the first quarter of 1809, which was subsequently published in March 1810. Knight and Salisbury thus beat Brown to print and claimed priority for the names that Brown had authored. As a result, Salisbury was accused of plagiarism, ostracised from botanical circles, and his publications were largely ignored during his lifetime. Although Salisbury's generic names have almost all been overturned, many of his specific names have been reinstated; since the nominal author was Knight, not Salisbury, Knight is now considered the author of a great many Proteaceae species.

On Hibbert's retirement around 1829, Hibbert passed his collection of living plants on to Knight, and helped him set up a nursery on Kings Road in Chelsea. It traded initially under the name Royal Exotic Nursery, and later, after partnering with Thomas Aloysius Perry, who married Knight's niece, as Knight & Perry. This nursery was a great success, and would eventually be sold and become one of the famous Veitch Nurseries.

== Personal ==
In 1820 Knight married Mary Lorymer. In 1831, he gave money to his old Parish in Lancashire, Brindle St Joseph's, to build a new school. This building is still in use as the Parish Hall. Some time after his wife's death in 1845, Knight built a mansion, Bitham House, in Avon Dassett, retiring there with his niece and Perry. Shortly before his death, he built a Catholic church of St Joseph in Avon Dassett. This was consecrated on 3 July 1855, only seventeen days before Knight's death on 20 July 1855.
