= On the cultivation of the plants belonging to the natural order of Proteeae =

1809 scientific paper by Joseph Knight

Title page

"On the cultivation of the plants belonging to the natural order of Proteeae" is an 1809 paper on the family Proteaceae of flowering plants. Although nominally written by Joseph Knight as a paper on cultivation techniques, all but 13 pages consists of an unattributed taxonomic revision now known to have been written by Richard Salisbury.

Publication of the paper triggered one of the most bitter disputes in 19th century botany, because Salisbury had preempted the publication of numerous plant names that Robert Brown had intended to publish. Brown's paper had already been read to the Linnean Society of London, at meeting which Salisbury had attended, but his paper had not yet made it to print. In publishing this paper before Brown's On the natural order of plants called Proteaceae had been printed, Salisbury beat Brown to print, claiming priority for the names that Brown had authored. As a result of this, Salisbury was accused of plagiarism and ostracised from botanical circles. Contemporary notes and letters indicate widespread condemnation of Salisbury's actions. For example, Samuel Goodenough wrote "How shocked was I to see Salisbury's surreptitious anticipation of Brown's paper on new Holland plants, under the name and disguise of Mr. Hibbert's gardener! Oh it is too bad!"; and James Edward Smith wrote that he had a copy of Knight's paper "but shall not keep it—I mean hereafter not to notice it or any other of the author's productions." Brown himself wrote of Salisbury "I scarcely know what to think of him except that he stands between a rogue and a fool."

Initially, Salisbury's names were ignored in favour of Brown's names. When the conservation of generic names was introduced in the 1900s, Brown's genera were formally conserved. However it was not possible to conserve species names until the 1980s, by which time the priority of Salisbury's species names had long been accepted. Thus On the cultivation of the plants belonging to the natural order of Proteeae is the source of numerous names of Proteaceae taxa.
