= Leucadendron loranthifolium =

Conservation status
- Near Threatened (IUCN 3.1)

Scientific classification
- Kingdom: Plantae
- Clade: Tracheophytes
- Clade: Angiosperms
- Clade: Eudicots
- Order: Proteales
- Family: Proteaceae
- Genus: Leucadendron
- Species: L. loranthifolium

Binomial name
- Leucadendron loranthifolium (Salisb. ex Knight) I.Williams

Species of plant

Leucadendron loranthifolium, commonly known as the green-flower sunbush, is a flower-bearing shrub belonging to the genus Leucadendron and forms part of the fynbos. The plant is native to the Western Cape where it occurs in the Gifberg, Cederberg, Sandveld, and Hex River Mountains.

The shrub grows 2.0 m (6.6 ft) tall and flowers from July to September. The plant dies after a fire but the seeds survive. The seeds are stored in a toll on the female plant and fall out of the toll soil after two months where they are spread by rodents. The plant is unisexual and there are separate plants with male and female flowers, which are pollinated by small beetles. The plant grows in sandy or rocky sandstone soils at altitudes of 80–1000 m.

In Afrikaans, it is known as Botterknoppietolbos. The tree's national number is 81.5.
