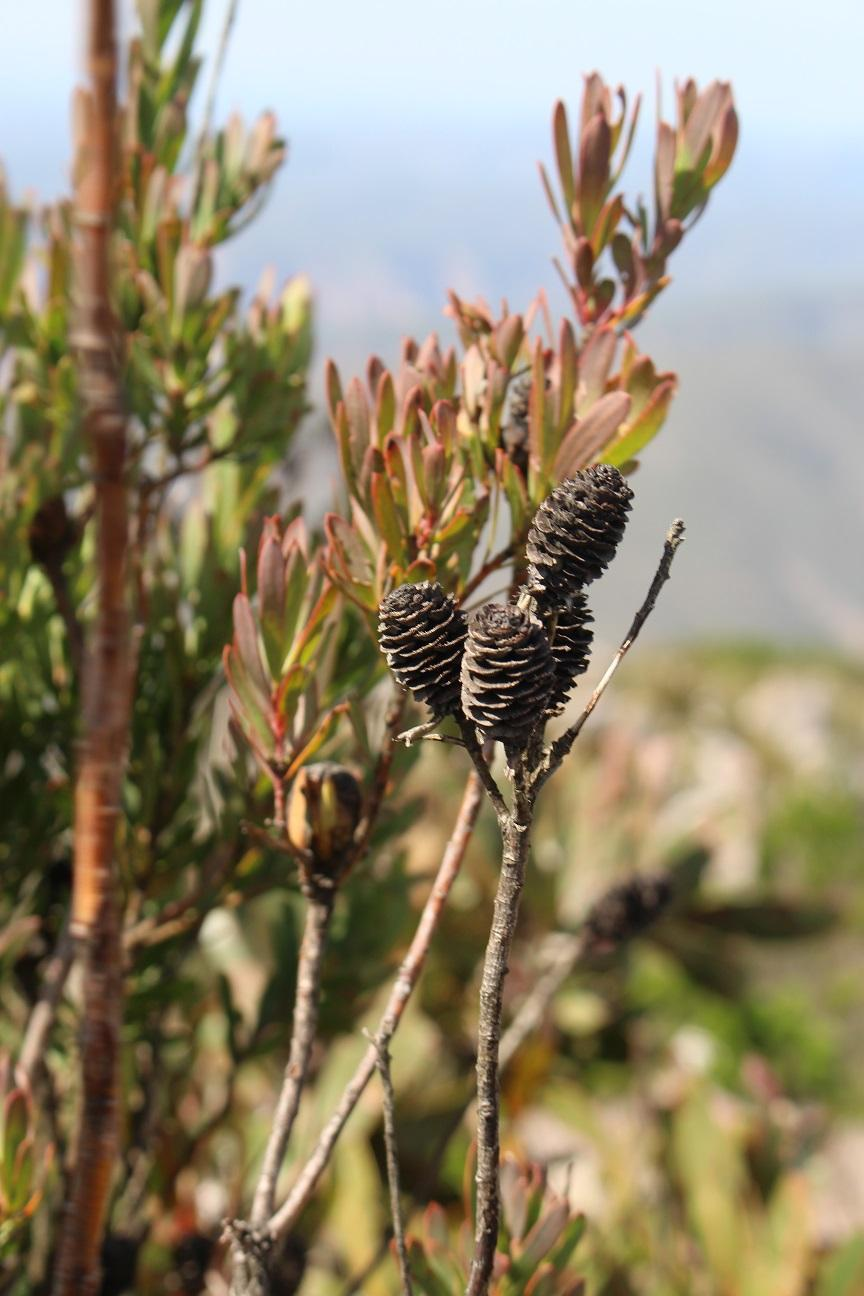

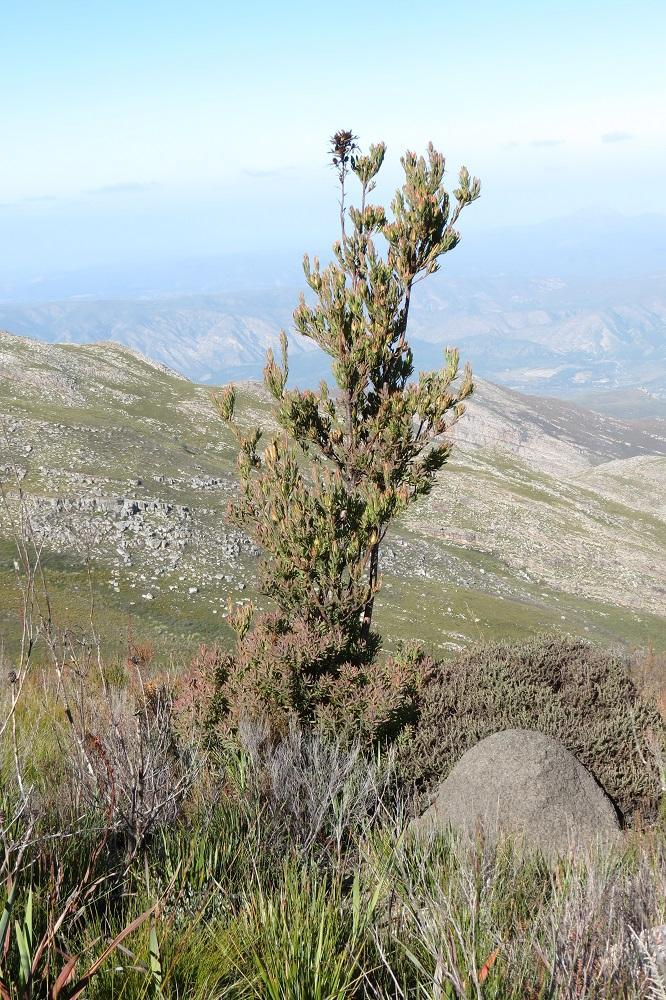

Conservation status
- Least Concern (IUCN 3.1)

Scientific classification
- Kingdom: Plantae
- Clade: Tracheophytes
- Clade: Angiosperms
- Clade: Eudicots
- Order: Proteales
- Family: Proteaceae
- Genus: Leucadendron
- Species: L. loeriense

Binomial name
- Leucadendron loeriense I.Williams

= Leucadendron loeriense =

Species of plant

Leucadendron loeriense, the Loerie conebush, is a flower-bearing shrub that belongs to the genus Leucadendron and forms part of the fynbos. The plant is native to the Western Cape, where it is found in the Elandsberg, Baviaanskloof and Groot-Winterhoek mountains. The shrub grows 2.5 m tall and flowers in December and January.

Fire destroys the plant but the seeds survive. The seeds are stored in a toll on the female plant and released where they fall to the ground and are possibly spread by the wind. The plant is unisexual, so there are separate plants with male and female flowers that are pollinated by insects. The plant grows mainly in sandstone soil at altitudes of 450–1200 m.

The tree's national number is 80.7.

In Afrikaans it is known as loerietolbos.

== Gallery ==
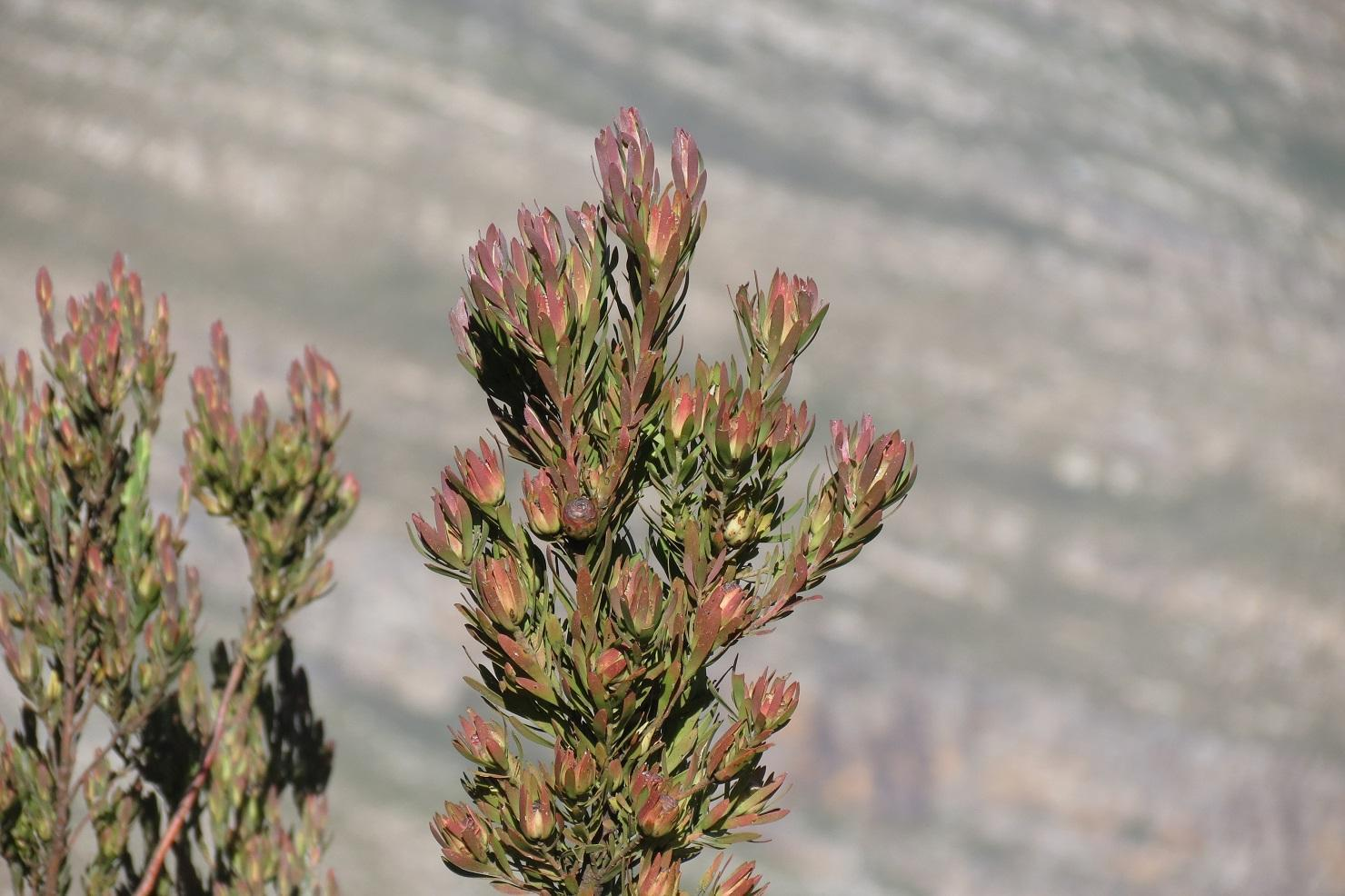

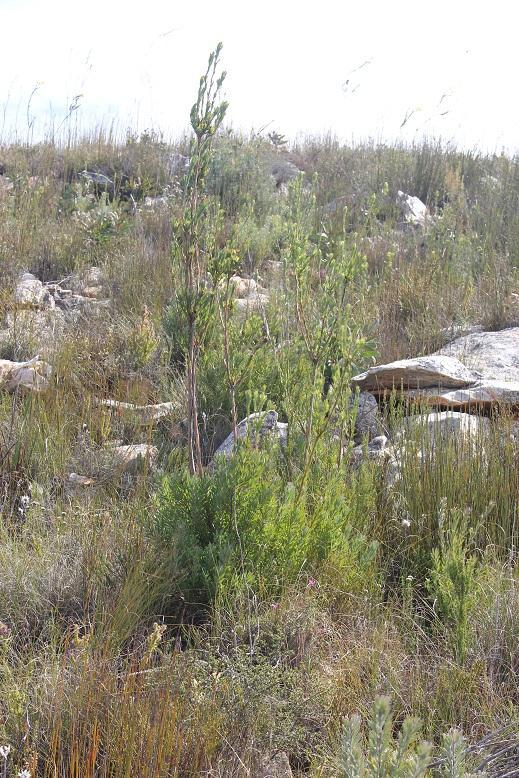
