= Leucadendron orientale =

Conservation status
- Vulnerable (IUCN 3.1)

Scientific classification
- Kingdom: Plantae
- Clade: Tracheophytes
- Clade: Angiosperms
- Clade: Eudicots
- Order: Proteales
- Family: Proteaceae
- Genus: Leucadendron
- Species: L. orientale

Binomial name
- Leucadendron orientale I.Williams

Species of flowering plant

Leucadendron orientale, the Van Staden's sunbush, is a flower-bearing shrub belonging to the genus Leucadendron and forms part of the fynbos. The plant is native to the Eastern Cape, where it occurs on the Elandsberg from Loerie to the Van Stadensberg. The shrub grows 1.3 m tall and bears flowers in June and July.

Fire destroys the plant but the seeds survive. The seeds are stored in a toll on the female plant and two months after the fruit has formed and ripened, it falls to the ground. The seeds are spread by rodents. The plant is unisexual; there are male and female plants that reproduce by the activities of small towers. The plant grows mainly in sandstone soils at altitudes of 150-850 m.

In Afrikaans it is known as gouerosettolbos.
