= Leucadendron roodii =

Conservation status
- Endangered (IUCN 3.1)

Scientific classification
- Kingdom: Plantae
- Clade: Tracheophytes
- Clade: Angiosperms
- Clade: Eudicots
- Order: Proteales
- Family: Proteaceae
- Genus: Leucadendron
- Species: L. roodii

Binomial name
- Leucadendron roodii E.Phillips

Species of plant

Leucadendron roodii, the Gifberg conebush, is a flowering shrub that belongs to the genus Leucadendron and forms part of the fynbos biome. The plant is endemic to the Western Cape province of South Africa, where it occurs on the Gifberg mountain.

The shrub grows to 2 m high and flowers from August to September. The plant dies after a fire but the seeds survive. The seeds are stored in a whorl on the female plant and only fall to the ground after a fire. The plant is unisexual and there are separate plants with male and female flowers, which are pollinated by small beetles. The plant grows mainly in sandy soil at altitudes of 260–550 m.

== Sources ==
- REDLIST Sanbi
- Biodiversityexplorer
- Protea Atlas
- Protea Atlas
- Plants of the World Online
