= Leucadendron cordatum =

Conservation status
- Least Concern (IUCN 3.1)

Scientific classification
- Kingdom: Plantae
- Clade: Tracheophytes
- Clade: Angiosperms
- Clade: Eudicots
- Order: Proteales
- Family: Proteaceae
- Genus: Leucadendron
- Species: L. cordatum

Binomial name
- Leucadendron cordatum E.Phillips

Species of plant

Leucadendron cordatum, the droopy conebush, is a flower-bearing shrub that belongs to the genus Leucadendron and forms part of the fynbos. The plant is native to the Western Cape and is rare. It occurs in the Langeberg between Koo and Barrydale as well as the Swartberg near Klaarstroom. The shrub grows 1 m tall and bears flowers from June to July.

Fire destroys the plant but the seeds survive. The seeds are stored in a toll on the female plant and fall to the ground after two months. The plant is unisexual and there are male and female plants. The activities of small towers and small rodents ensure that the plants are pollinated. The plant grows mainly rocky sandstone soil at altitudes of 500–1900 m.

In Afrikaans it is known as bergkatjiepiering.
