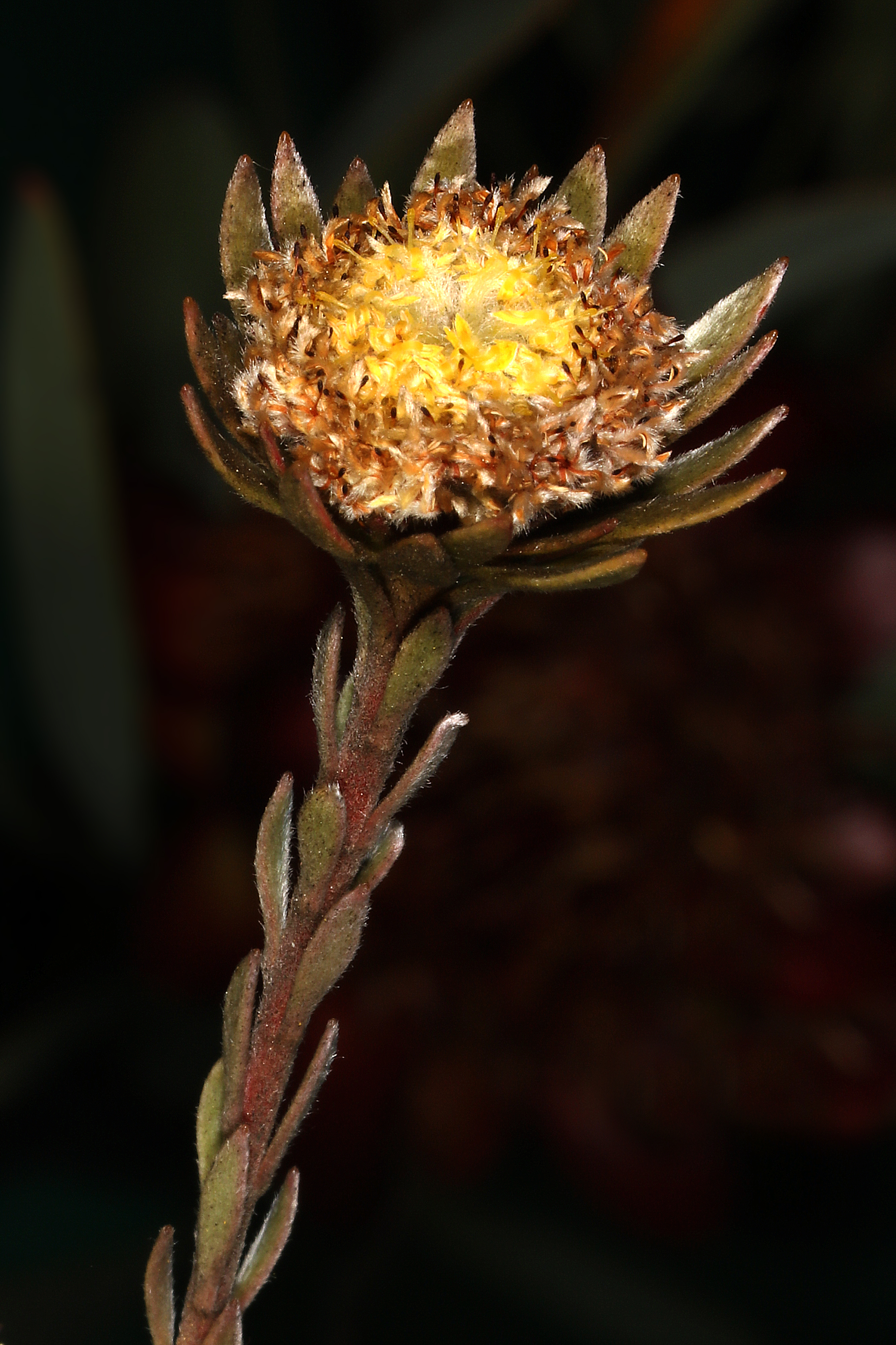

Conservation status
- Least Concern (IUCN 3.1)

Scientific classification
- Kingdom: Plantae
- Clade: Tracheophytes
- Clade: Angiosperms
- Clade: Eudicots
- Order: Proteales
- Family: Proteaceae
- Genus: Leucadendron
- Species: L. nitidum

Binomial name
- Leucadendron nitidum H.Buek ex Meisn.

= Leucadendron nitidum =

Species of plant

Leucadendron nitidum, the Bokkeveld conebush, is a flower-bearing shrub that belongs to the genus Leucadendron and forms part of the fynbos. The plant is native to the Western Cape where it occurs at Cederberg, Koue Bokkeveld and Swartruggensberge.

The shrub grows 2.0 m tall and flowers from May to November. The plant dies in a fire but the seeds survive. The seeds are stored in a toll on the female plant and fall to the ground after two months and are spread by ants. The plant is unisexual and there are separate plants with male and female flowers, which are pollinated by small insects. The plant grows mainly in sandstone and quartzite sand at altitudes of 1,000 - 2,000 m.

In Afrikaans it is known as Bokkeveld-tolbos.

== Gallery ==
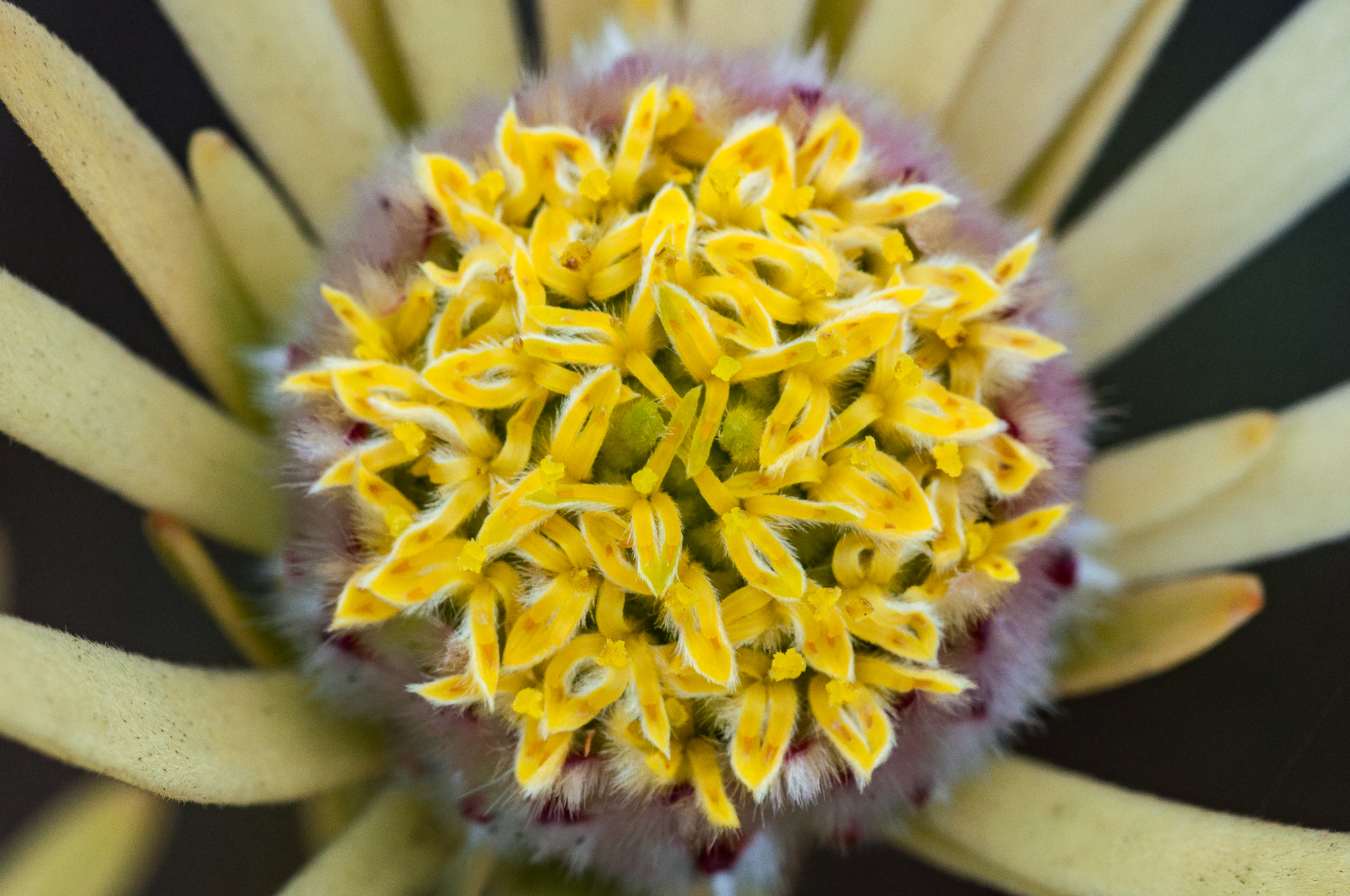

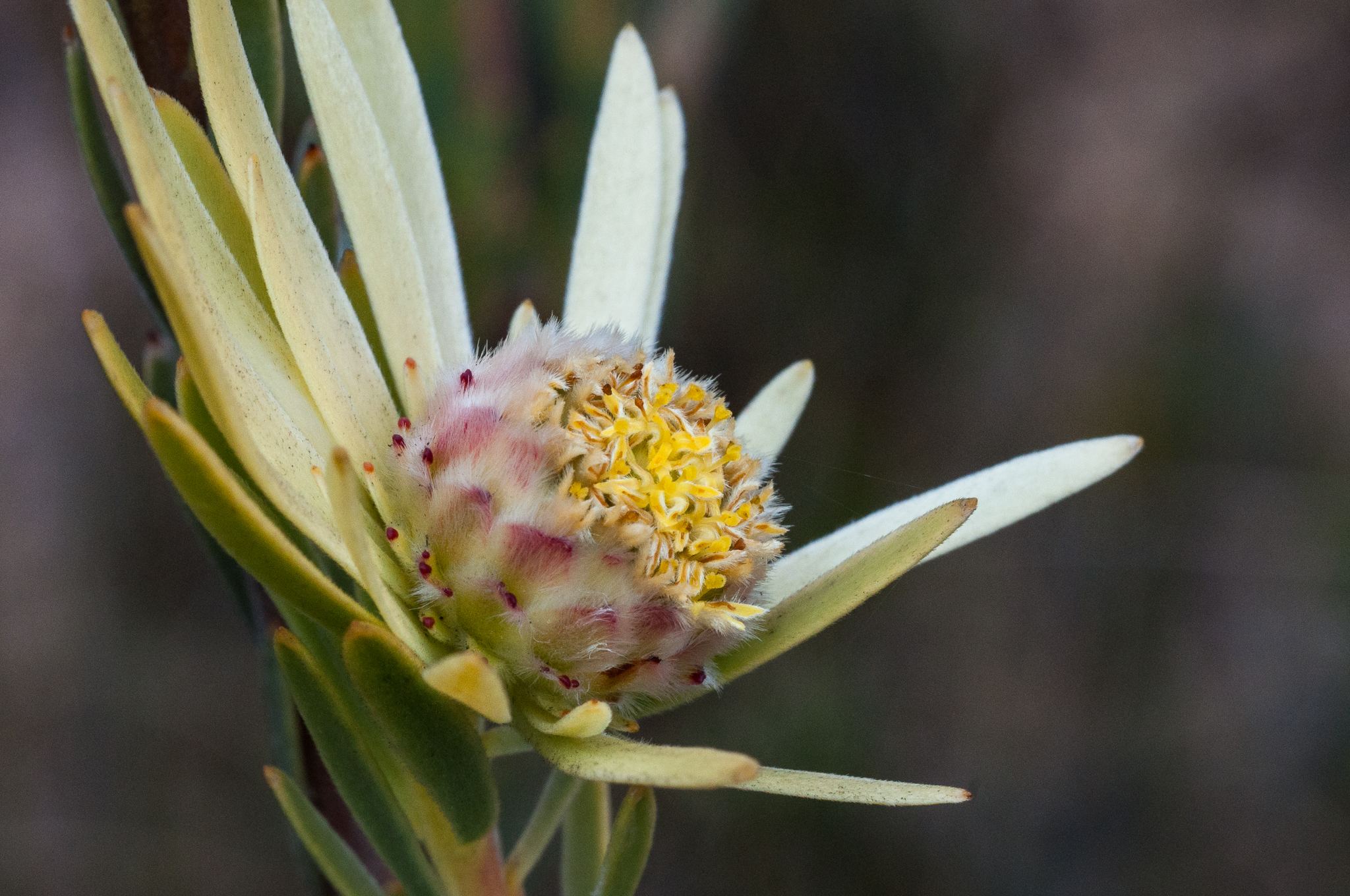

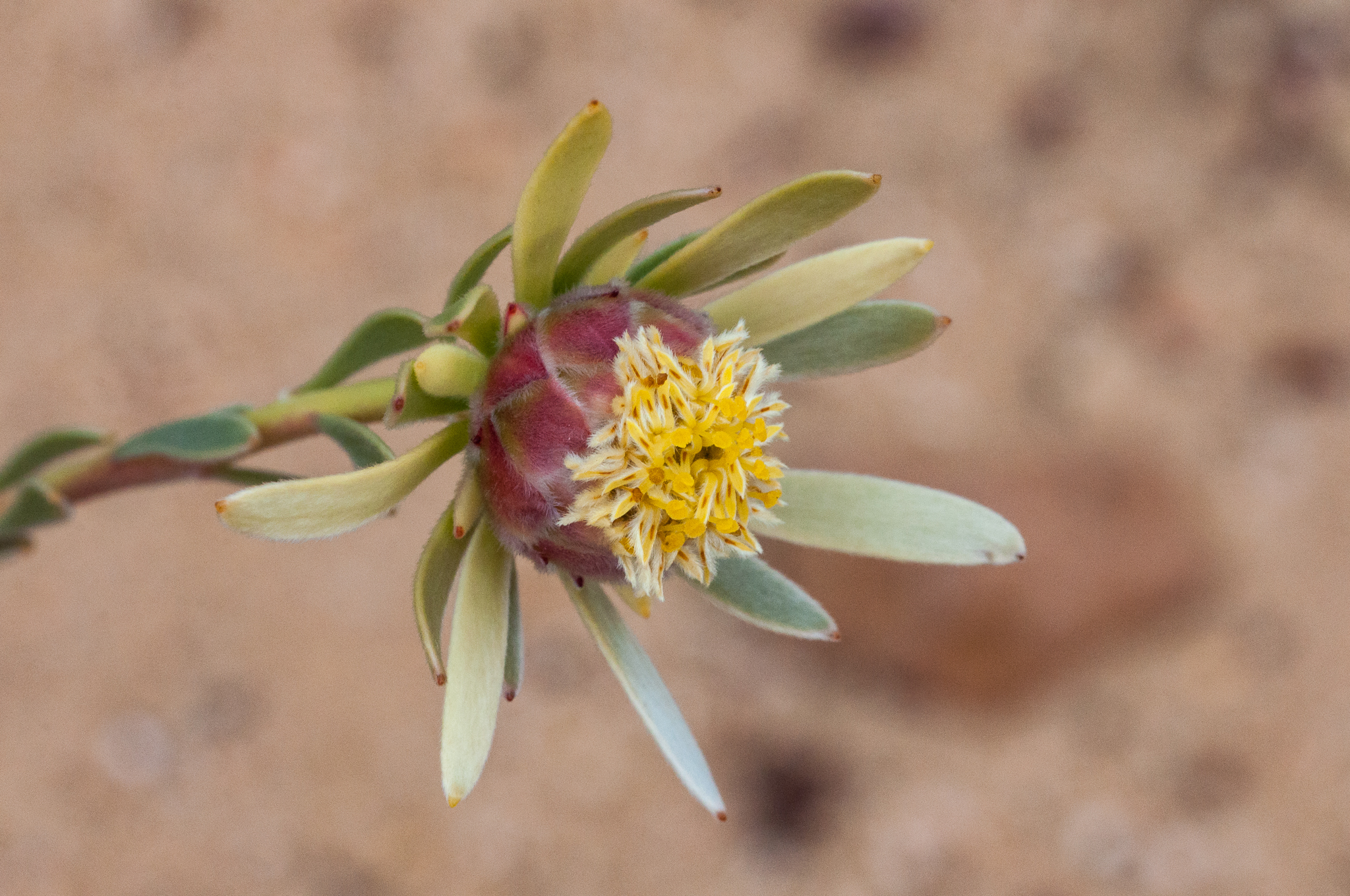

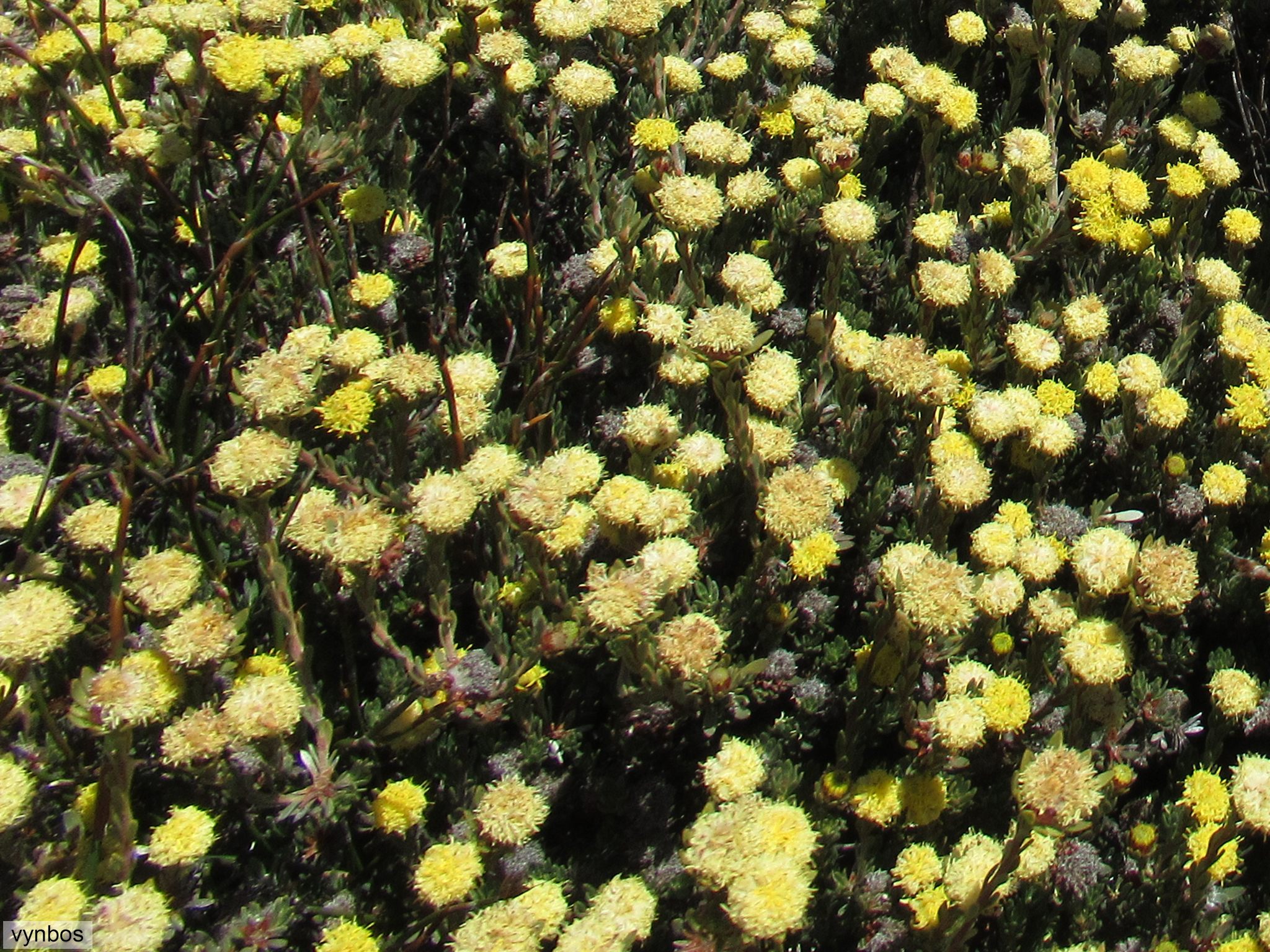

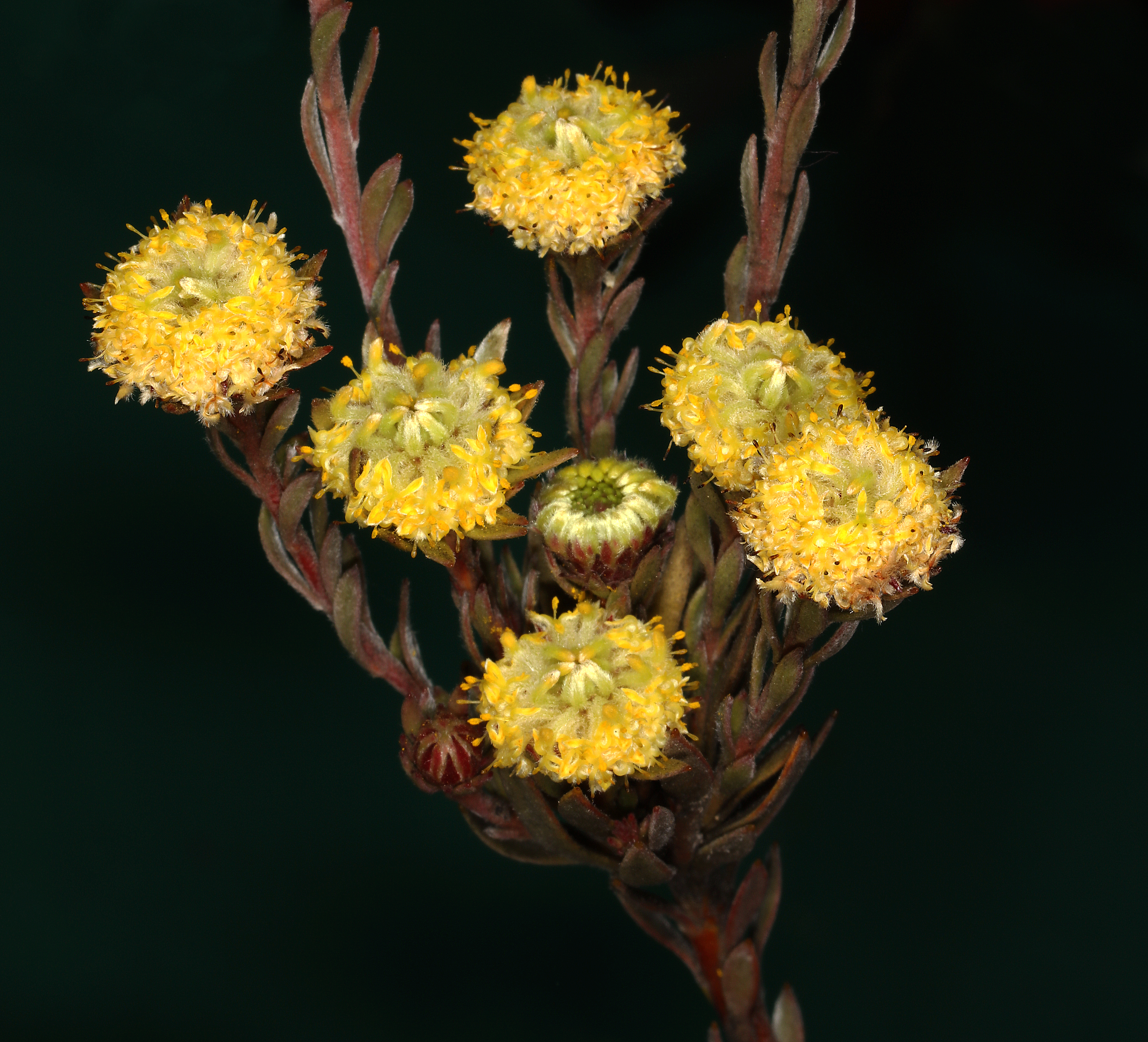

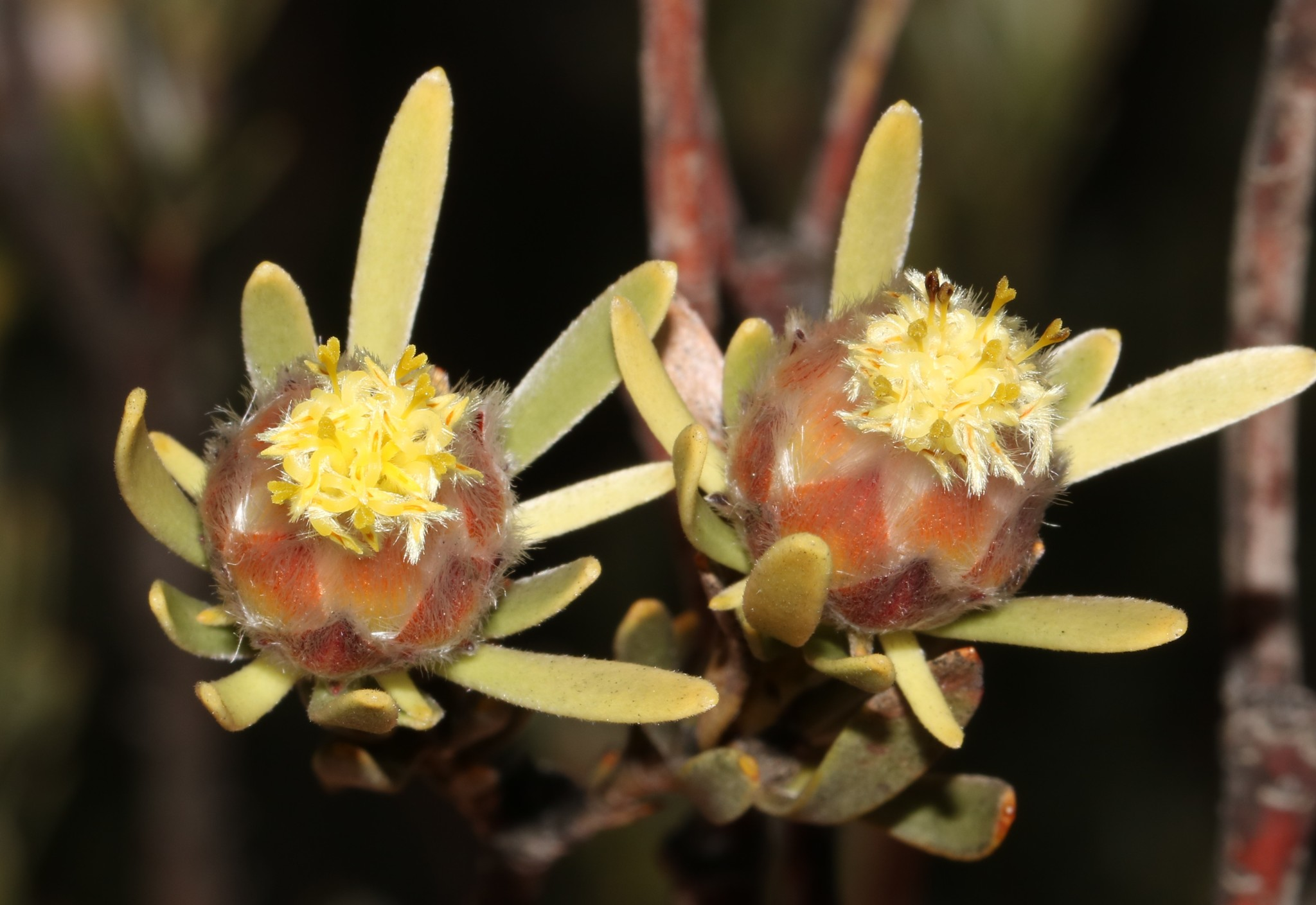
