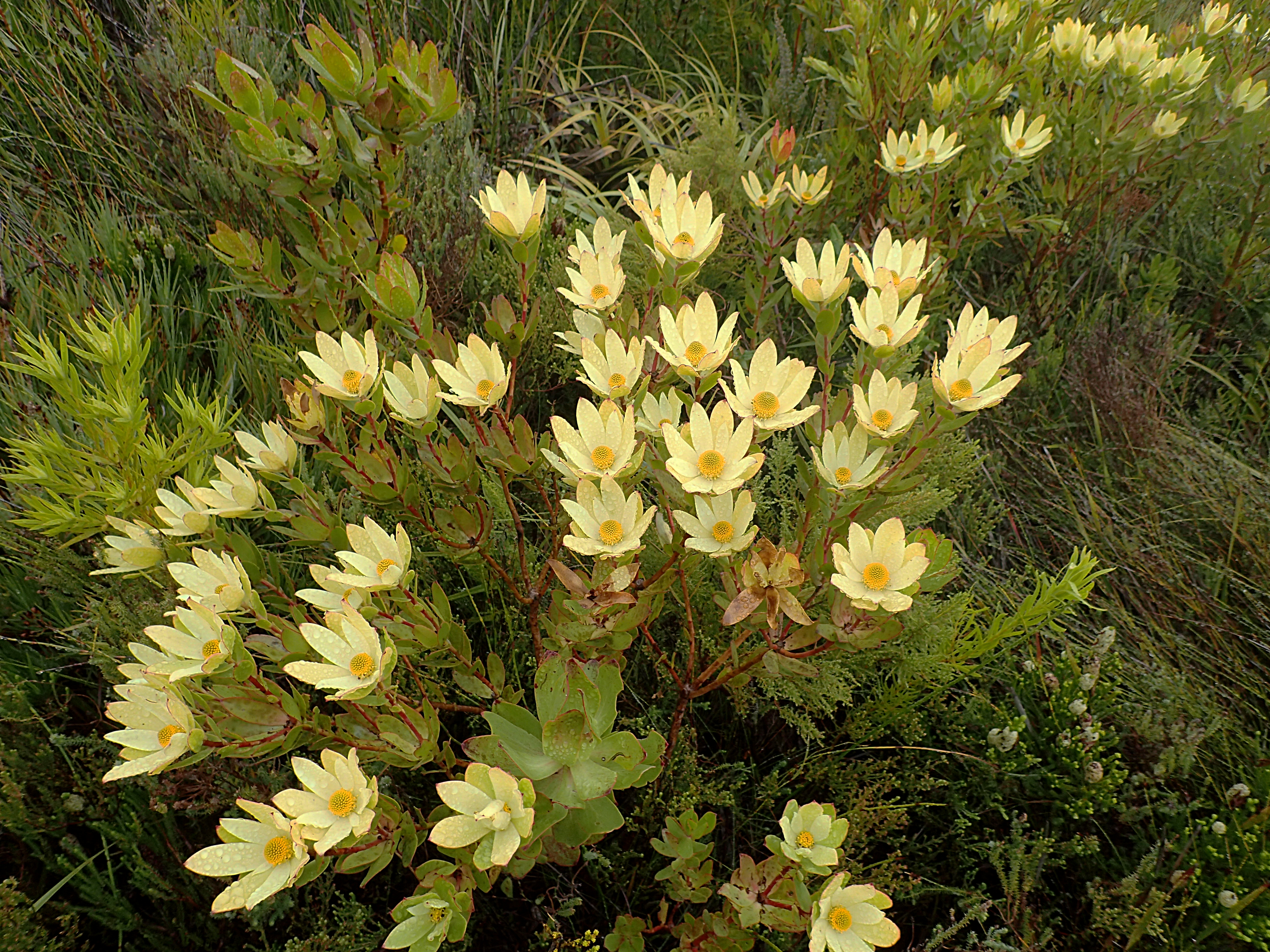

Conservation status
- Least Concern (IUCN 3.1)

Scientific classification
- Kingdom: Plantae
- Clade: Embryophytes
- Clade: Tracheophytes
- Clade: Angiosperms
- Clade: Eudicots
- Order: Proteales
- Family: Proteaceae
- Genus: Leucadendron
- Species: L. gandogeri

Binomial name
- Leucadendron gandogeri Schinz ex Gand. (1913)

Synonyms
- Leucadendron guthricae T.M.Salter (1943)

= Leucadendron gandogeri =

Species of plant native to South Africa

Leucadendron gandogeri, also known as cloudbank ginny, is a species of plant in the genus Leucadendron. It is native to the southwestern Cape Provinces of South Africa. It typically grows in fire-prone shrublands.
