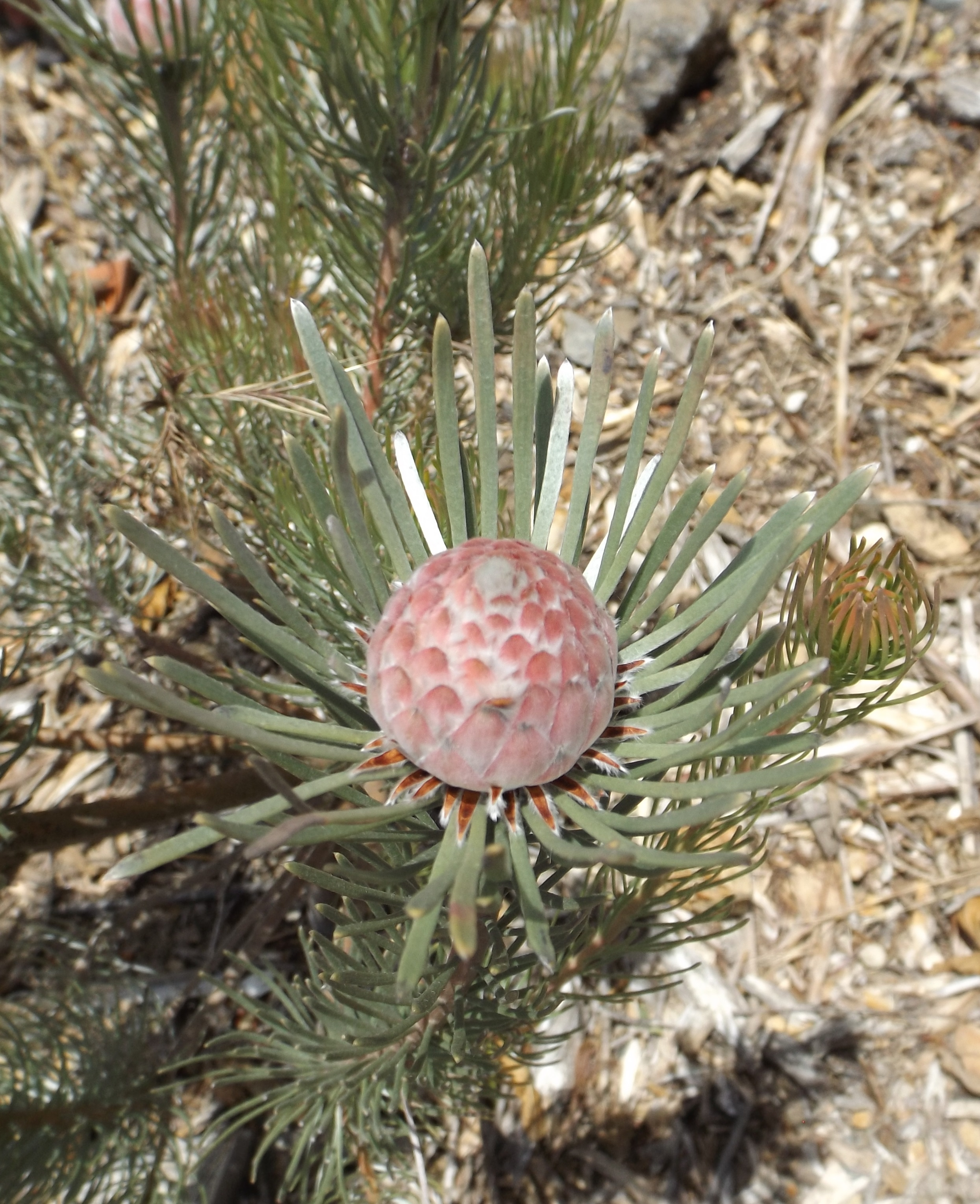

Conservation status
- Least Concern (IUCN 3.1)

Scientific classification
- Kingdom: Plantae
- Clade: Embryophytes
- Clade: Tracheophytes
- Clade: Angiosperms
- Clade: Eudicots
- Order: Proteales
- Family: Proteaceae
- Genus: Leucadendron
- Species: L. album

Binomial name
- Leucadendron album (Thunb.) Fourc. (1932)

Synonyms
- Leucadendron aurantiacum H. Buek ex Meisn. (1856); Leucadendron proteoides L. (1912), nom. illeg.; Protea alba Thunb. (1781); Protea aurantiaca Kuntze (1891)

= Leucadendron album =

Species of plant from South Africa

Leucadendron album, commonly known as linear-leaf conebush, is a species of flowering plant in the family Proteaceae. It is native to the southern Cape Provinces of South Africa.

== Gallery ==
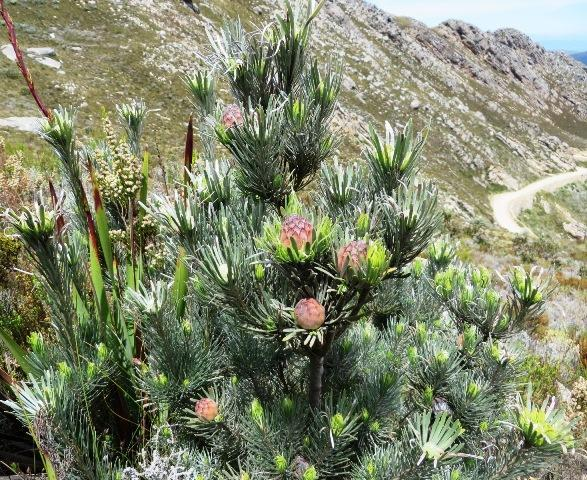

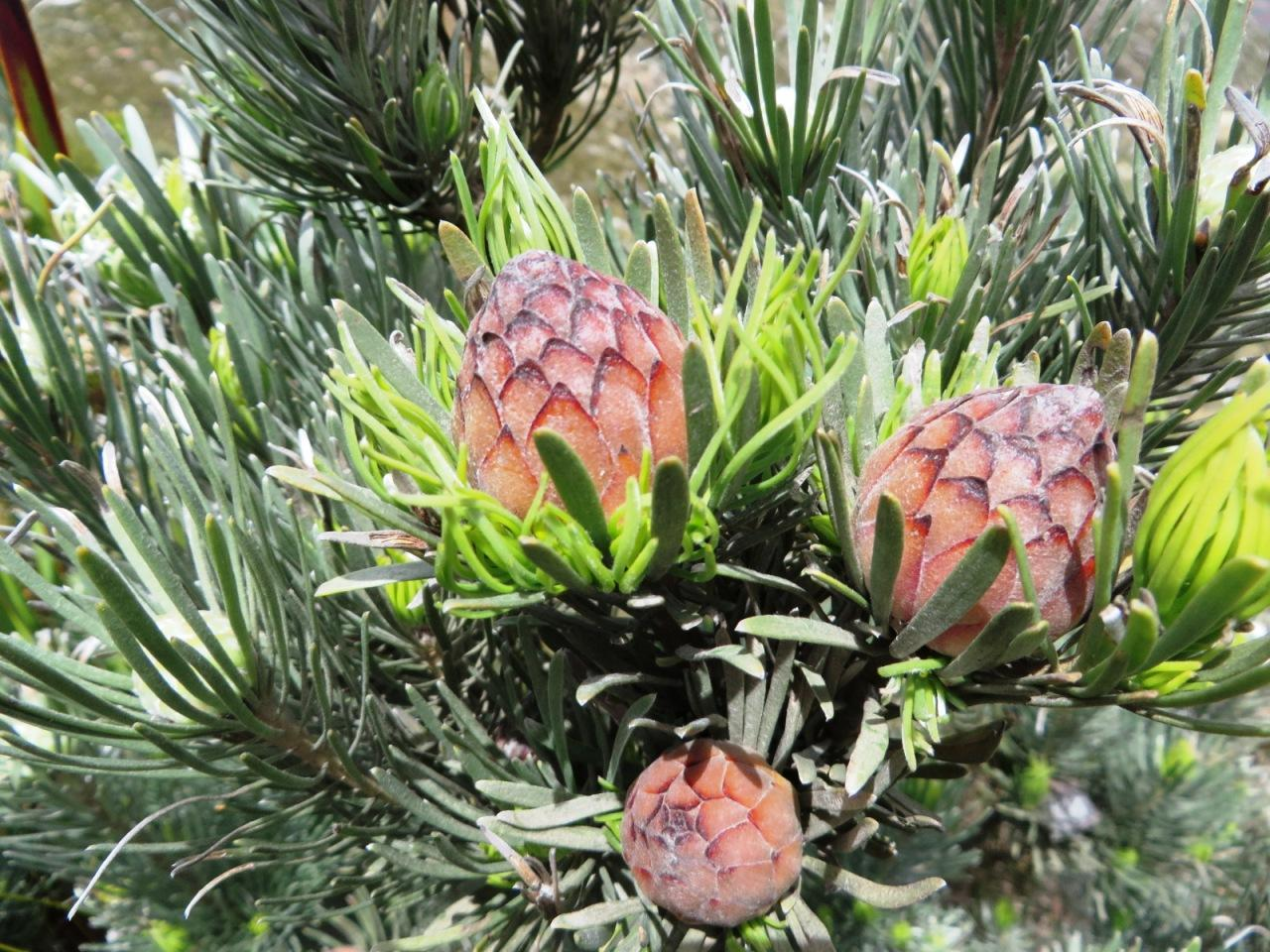

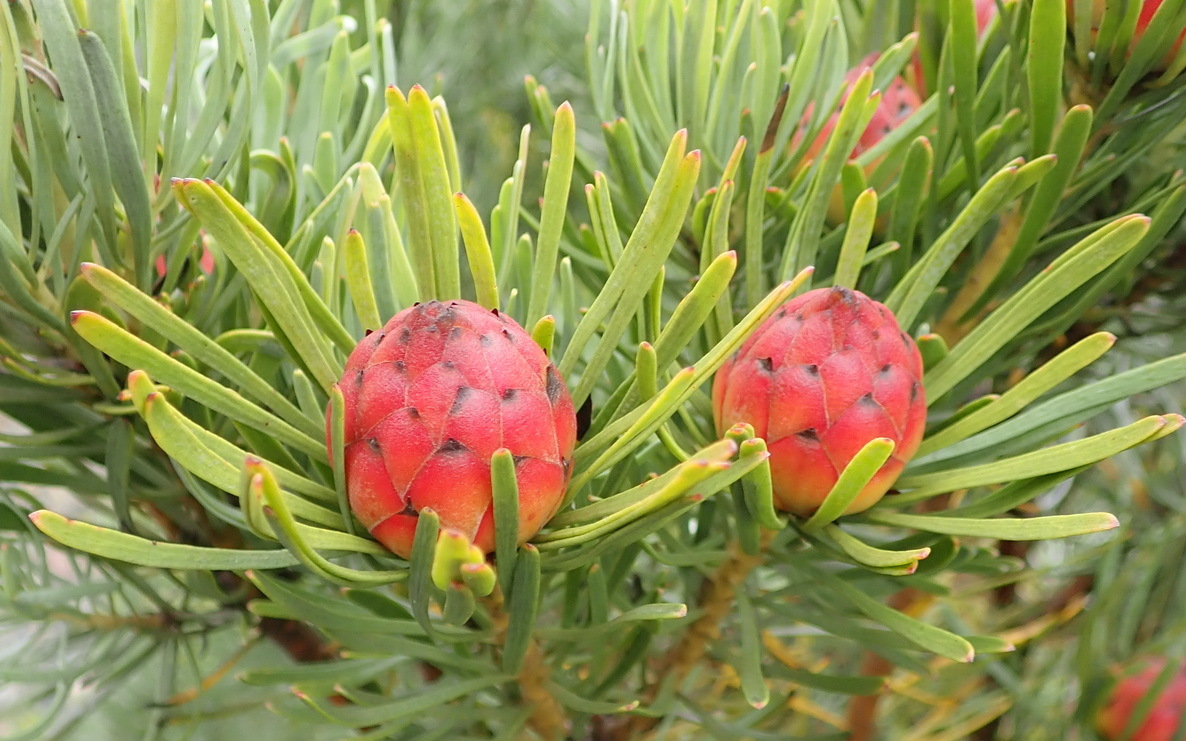

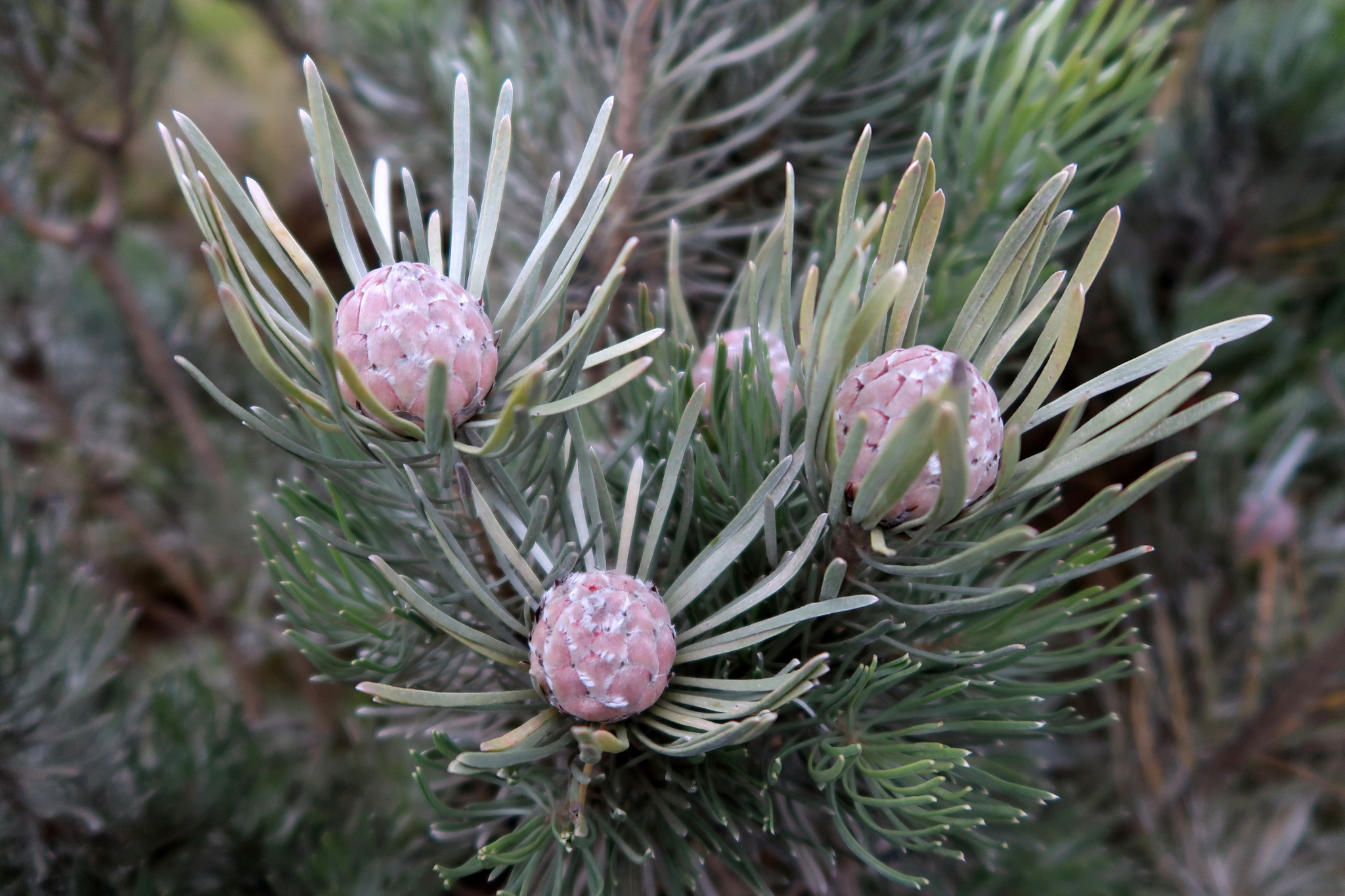

== References and further reading ==
- Coombes, A.J. 1992. Guide to plant names. Reed International Books, London.
- Germishuizen, G. & Meyer, N.L. (eds). 2003. Plants of southern Africa : an annotated checklist. Strelitzia 14. National Botanical Institute, Pretoria.
- Rebelo, A. (Tony). 1995. Proteas. A field guide to the proteas of southern Africa. edn 2. Fernwood Press, Vlaeberg, Cape Town.
- Rousseau, F. 1970. The Proteaceae of South Africa. Purnell, Cape Town.
- Stearn, W.T. 1966. Botanical Latin. edn 4. Timber Press, Portland. Oregon. USA.
- Stearn, W.T. 1992. Stearn's dictionary of plant names for gardeners. Timber Press, Portland. Oregon. USA.
