= Leucadendron remotum =

Conservation status
- Endangered (IUCN 3.1)

Scientific classification
- Kingdom: Plantae
- Clade: Tracheophytes
- Clade: Angiosperms
- Clade: Eudicots
- Order: Proteales
- Family: Proteaceae
- Genus: Leucadendron
- Species: L. remotum

Binomial name
- Leucadendron remotum I.Williams, 1969

Species of plant

Leucadendron remotum, the Nieuwoudtville conebush, is a flowering shrub that belongs to the genus Leucadendron and forms part of the fynbos biome. The plant is endemic to the Northern Cape where it occurs on the Bokkeveld escarpment south of Nieuwoudtville.

The shrub grows to 1.7 m high and flowers from August to September. The plant is unisexual and there are separate plants with male and female flowers, which are pollinated by the action of small beetles. The plant grows on slopes at altitudes of 680 to 860 m.

== Sources ==
- REDLIST Sanbi
- Biodiversityexplorer
- Protea Atlas
- Protea Atlas
- Plants of the World ONline
