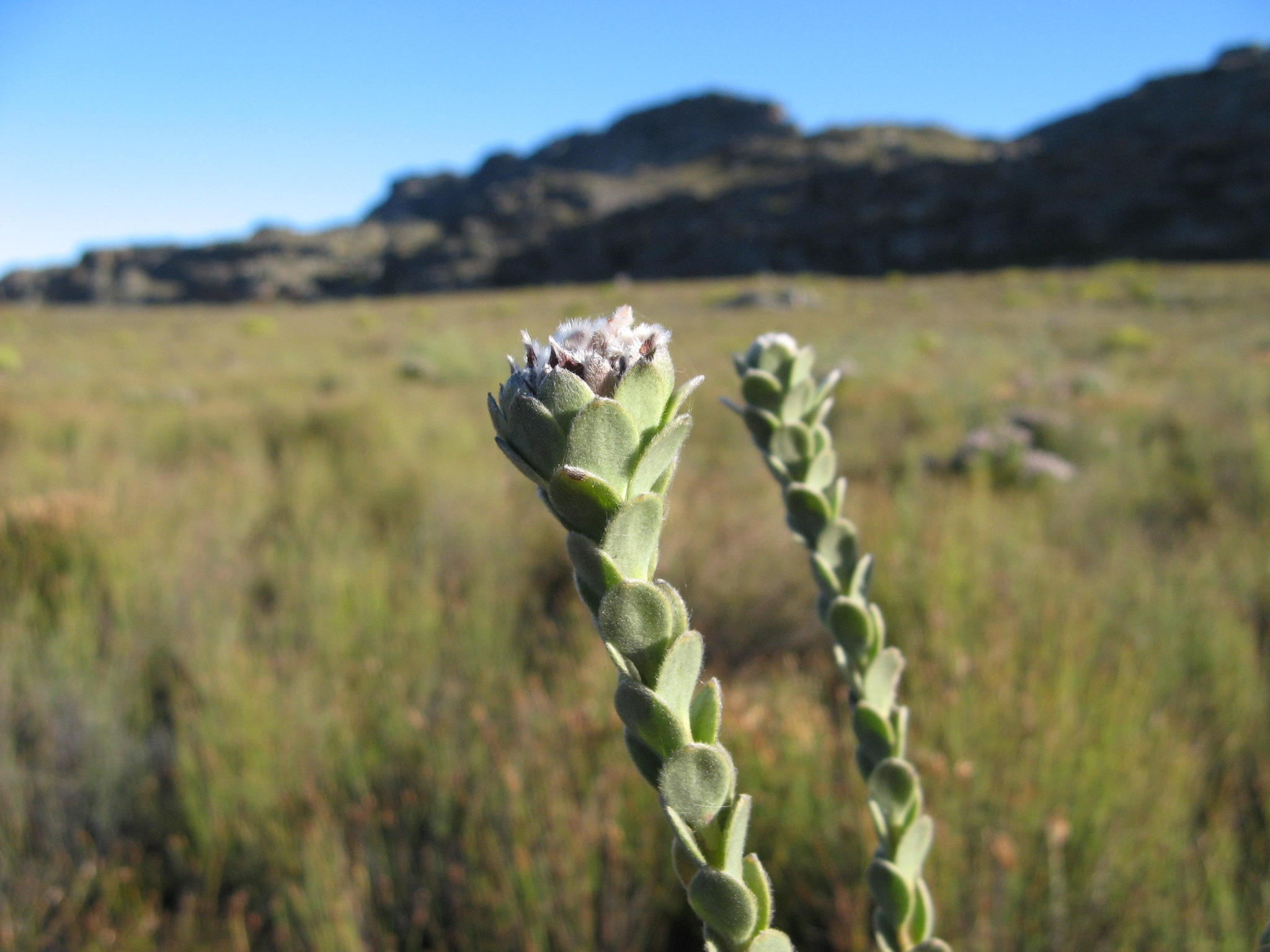

Conservation status
- Vulnerable (IUCN 3.1)

Scientific classification
- Kingdom: Plantae
- Clade: Tracheophytes
- Clade: Angiosperms
- Clade: Eudicots
- Order: Proteales
- Family: Proteaceae
- Genus: Leucadendron
- Species: L. concavum

Binomial name
- Leucadendron concavum I.Williams

= Leucadendron concavum =

Pakhuis conebush

Species of flowering plant

Leucadendron concavum, the Pakhuis conebush, is a flower-bearing shrub that belongs to the genus Leucadendron and forms part of the fynbos. The plant is native to the Western Cape where it occurs at the Pakhuis Pass in the Cederberg.

The shrub grows 1.5 m tall and flowers in September. The plant dies in a fire but the seeds survive. The seeds are stored in a toll on the female plant and fall to the ground after a fire. The plant is unisexual and there are separate plants with male and female flowers, which are pollinated by insects. The plant grows mainly on a sandy plateau at elevations of 1 000 m.

In Afrikaans it is known as Pakhuistolbos.
