= Leucadendron gydoense =

Conservation status
- Endangered (IUCN 3.1)

Scientific classification
- Kingdom: Plantae
- Clade: Tracheophytes
- Clade: Angiosperms
- Clade: Eudicots
- Order: Proteales
- Family: Proteaceae
- Genus: Leucadendron
- Species: L. gydoense

Binomial name
- Leucadendron gydoense I.Williams

Species of flowering plant

Leucadendron gydoense, the Gydo conebush, is a flower-bearing shrub that belongs to the genus Leucadendron and forms part of the fynbos. The plant is native to the Western Cape, South Africa.

== Description ==
The shrub grows 2 m (6.6 ft) tall and flowers in October. The plant dies in a fire but the seeds survive. The seeds are stored in a toll on the female plant and fall to the ground after a fire and are spread by the wind. The plant is unisexual and there are separate plants with male and female flowers.

In Afrikaans, it is known as Gydo-tolbos.

== Distribution and habitat ==
The plant occurs in the Kouebokkeveld and Hex River Mountains.
