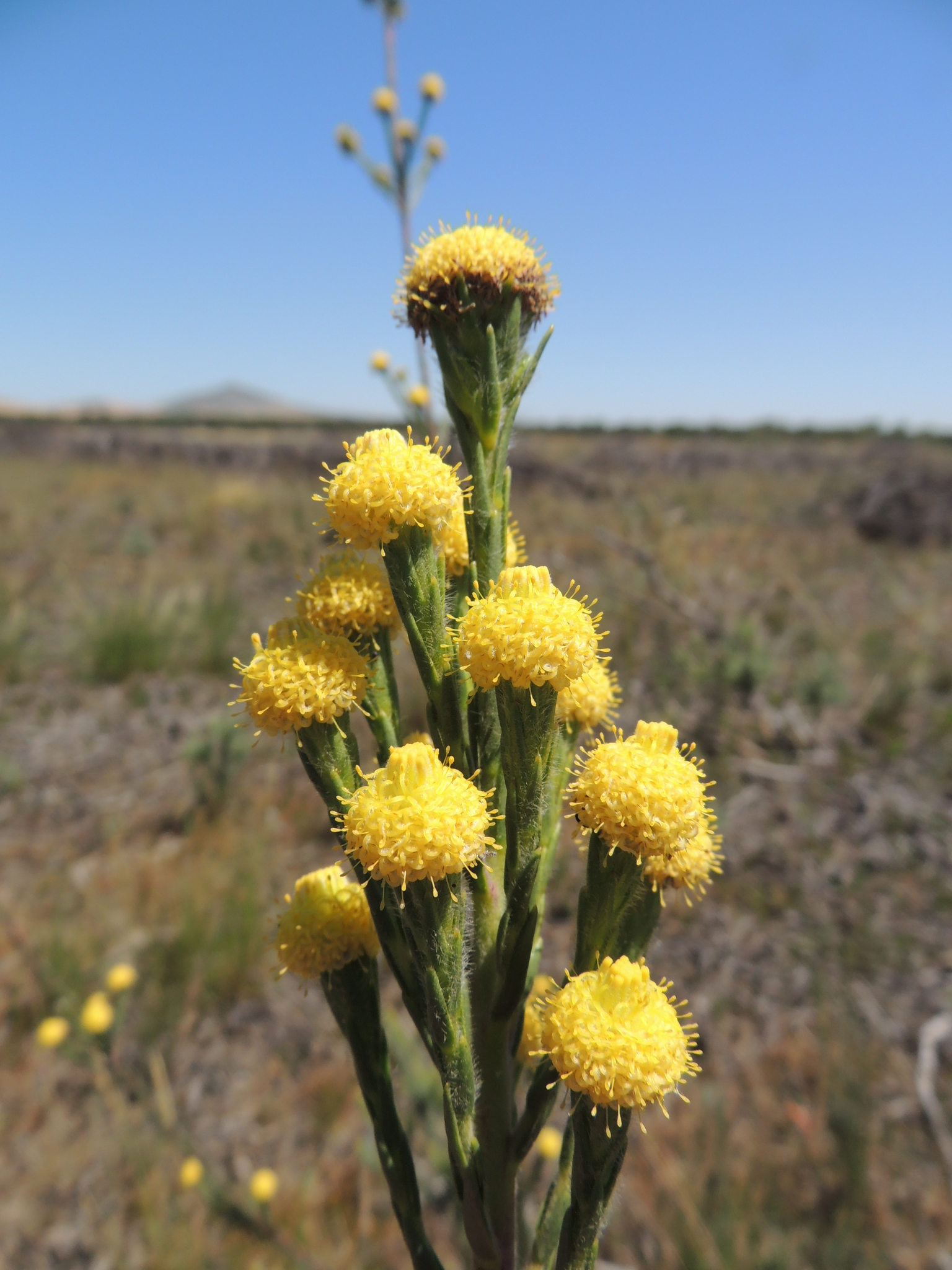

Conservation status
- Near Threatened (IUCN 3.1)

Scientific classification
- Kingdom: Plantae
- Clade: Tracheophytes
- Clade: Angiosperms
- Clade: Eudicots
- Order: Proteales
- Family: Proteaceae
- Genus: Leucadendron
- Species: L. corymbosum

Binomial name
- Leucadendron corymbosum P.J.Bergius

= Leucadendron corymbosum =

Species of Plant

Leucadendron corymbosum, the swartveld conebush, is a flower-bearing shrub that belongs to the genus Leucadendron and forms part of the fynbos. The plant is native to the Western Cape and occurs from Michells Pass to Paarl. The shrub grows up to 2 m high.

In Afrikaans it is known as Swartlandtolbos.
