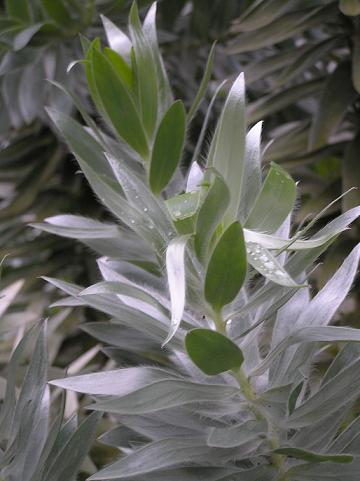
- Leucadendron argenteum

Scientific classification
- Kingdom: Plantae
- Clade: Tracheophytes
- Clade: Angiosperms
- Clade: Eudicots
- Order: Proteales
- Family: Proteaceae
- Subfamily: Proteoideae
- Tribe: Leucadendreae
- Subtribe: Leucadendrinae
- Genus: Leucadendron; R.Br.
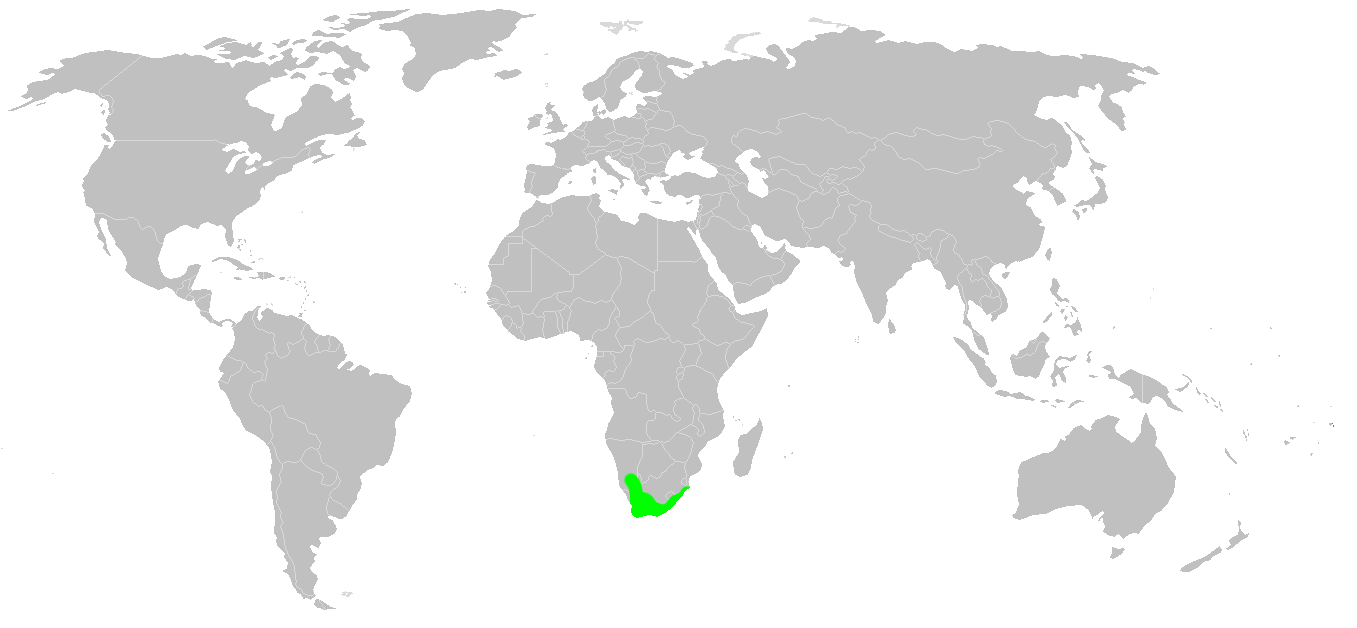
- Natural range of the genus

Synonyms
- Chasme Salisb. (1807); Euryspermum Salisb. (1807); Gissonia Salisb. ex Knight (1809); Lepidocarpus Adans. (1763), nom. superfl.; Protea L. (1753), nom. rej.; Vionaea Neck. (1790), opus utique oppr.

= Leucadendron =

Genus of plants

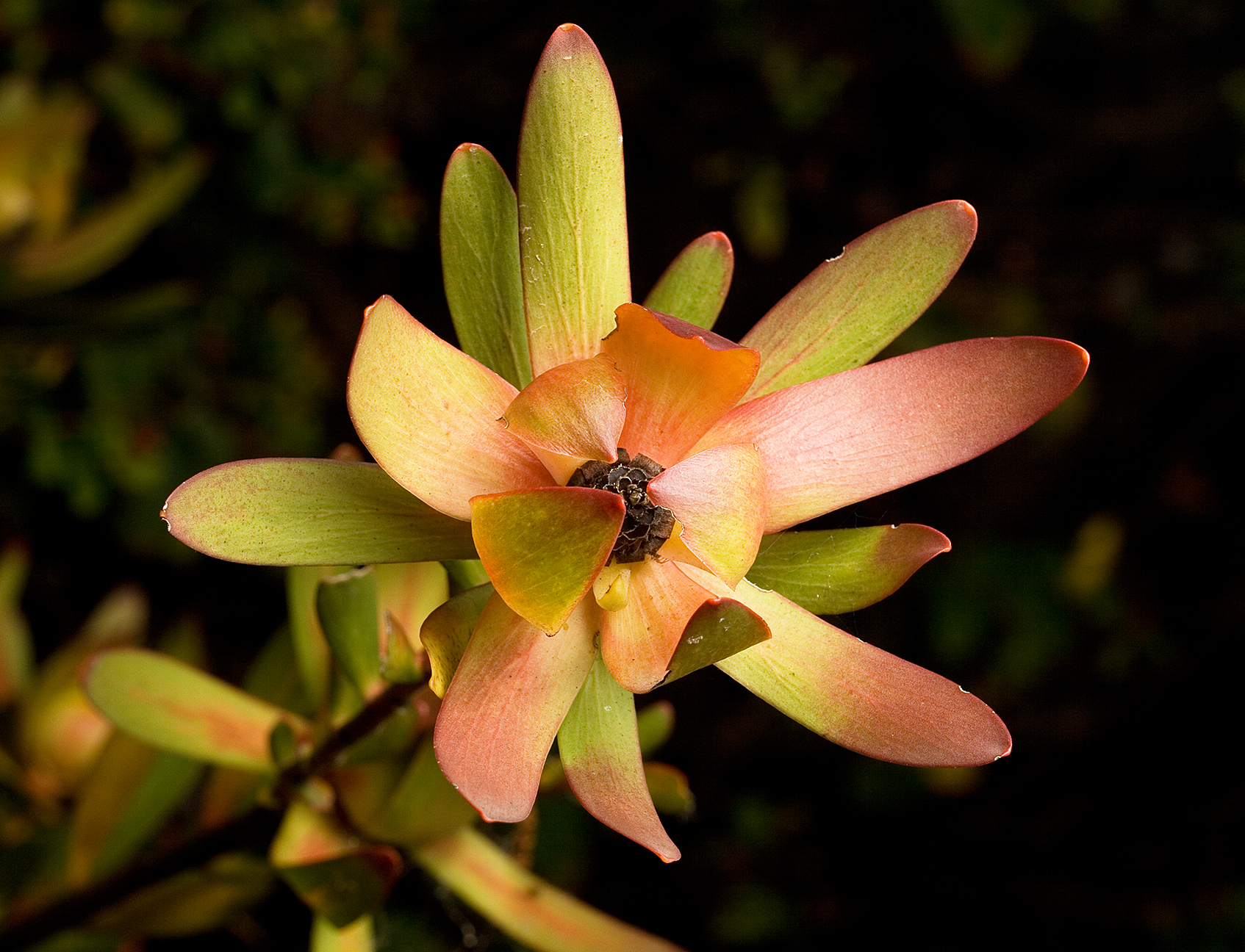
Leucadendron salignum

Leucadendron is a genus of about 80 species of flowering plants in the family Proteaceae, endemic to the Cape Provinces and KwaZulu-Natal in South Africa, where they are a prominent part of the fynbos ecoregion and vegetation type.

== Description ==
Species in the genus Leucadendron are small trees or shrubs that are erect or creeping. Most species are shrubs that grow up to 1 m (3 ft 3 in) tall, some to 2–3 m (6 ft 7 in – 9 ft 10 in). A few grow into moderate-sized trees up to 16 m (52 ft) tall. All are evergreen. The leaves are largely elliptical, sometimes needle-like, spirally arranged, simple, entire, and usually green, often covered with a waxy bloom, and in the case of the Silvertree, with a distinct silvery tone produced by dense, straight, silky hairs. This inspired the generic name Leucadendron, which literally means "white tree". Leucadendron plants also contain sexual dimorphism in the leaves affecting leaf size.

The flowers are produced in dense, inflorescences at the branch tips; plants are dioecious, with separate male and female plants. The degree of sexual dimorphism between males and females greatly varies with the genus; some species exhibiting no morphological difference, while others show the highest degree of dimorphism in angiosperms.

The seed heads, or infructescences, of Leucadendron are woody cone-like structures. This gave rise to their generic common name cone-bush. The cones contain numerous seeds. Species within the genus have various survival and reproductive strategies to cope with periodic fire disturbance and nutrient poor soils of the fynbos ecosystem. Variation in fire frequency and climate has contributed to the evolution of differing seed bank types for the genus. The seed morphology is varied and reflects subgeneric groupings within the genus. A few such as the Silvertree, Leucadendron argenteum have a silky-haired parachute, enabling the large round nut to be dispersed by wind. A few are rodent dispersed, cached by rats, and a few have elaiosomes and are dispersed by ants. Some species exhibit polymorphic coloring in their seeds, which suggested to be a seed crypsis adaptation to substrate-specific seed predation biases. Compared to other fire-prone plant species, Leucadendron serotiny is relatively weak. About half the species store the seeds in fire-proof cones and release them only after a fire has killed the plant or at least the branch bearing the cone. Many such species hardly recruit naturally except after fires.

Fossil record reveals the genus first arose during the Cenozoic 30 millions years ago when fire-tolerant traits were first evolving.

A study in 2021 concluded that the genus is facing risk of extinction, with 2 already extinct species, 51.1% of species threatened and 71.8% of species of conservational concern. Factors threatening various species in the genus include habitat loss and fragmentation due to urban expansion, poor land management, alien invasive plants, overgrazing, inappropriate fire management, and wildflower harvesting for the flower cut industry.

== Cultivation ==
Leucadendron plants are conventionally propagated through seedlings as well as cuttings. They are sought out in the cut flower industry for their naturally unique and bright colors. The seeds reach maturity over a duration of a year. This time of germination and emergence depends on the species. When using cuttings as propagating material, the season as well as the type of material used can affect the success rate of the cultivation. Cuttings are preferred as propagating material because it provides uniform offspring, whereas seedlings produce genetic variability in the offspring. The genus Leucadendron is more prone to genetic variation than a genus that tends to self-fertilize, because of its cross-pollinating nature. In the natural habitat, Leucadendron grows exceptionally well, but in the case of cultivation the specific needs of the plant have to be readily available to allow optimal production of high quality cut flowers and foliage. Steps for cultivation include soil evaluation, clearing, drainage, chemical correction, and the physical preparation should be critically considered five months prior to planting Leucadendron.

== Species ==
85 species are accepted.

- Leucadendron album (Thunb.) Fourc.
- Leucadendron arcuatum (Lam.) I.Williams
- Leucadendron argenteum R.Br.
- Leucadendron barkerae I.Williams
- Leucadendron bonum I.Williams
- Leucadendron brunioides Meisn.
- Leucadendron burchellii I.Williams
- Leucadendron cadens I.Williams
- Leucadendron chamelaea (Lam.) I.Williams
- Leucadendron cinereum (Aiton) R.Br.
- Leucadendron comosum R.Br.
- Leucadendron concavum I.Williams
- Leucadendron conicum (Lam.) I.Williams
- Leucadendron coniferum (L.) Sieber ex Meisn.
- Leucadendron cordatum E.Phillips
- Leucadendron coriaceum E.Phillips & Hutch.
- Leucadendron corymbosum P.J.Bergius
- Leucadendron cryptocephalum L.Guthrie
- Leucadendron daphnoides Meisn.
- Leucadendron diemontianum I.Williams
- Leucadendron discolor E.Phillips & Hutch.
- Leucadendron dregei E.Mey. ex Meisn.
- Leucadendron dubium (Meisn.) E.Phillips & Hutch.
- Leucadendron elimense E.Phillips
- Leucadendron ericifolium R.Br.
- Leucadendron eucalyptifolium H.Buek ex Meisn.
- Leucadendron flexuosum I.Williams
- Leucadendron floridum R.Br.
- Leucadendron foedum I.Williams
- Leucadendron galpinii E.Phillips & Hutch.
- Leucadendron gandogeri Schinz ex Gand.
- Leucadendron glaberrimum (Schltr.) Compton
- Leucadendron globosum (Andrews) I.Williams
- Leucadendron glutinosum (Knight) Hutch.
- Leucadendron gydoense I.Williams
- Leucadendron immoderatum Rourke
- Leucadendron lanigerum H.Buek ex Meisn.
- Leucadendron laureolum (Lam.) Fourc.
- Leucadendron laxum I.Williams
- Leucadendron levisanus (L.) P.J.Bergius
- Leucadendron linifolium R.Br.
- Leucadendron loeriense I.Williams
- Leucadendron loranthifolium (Salisb. ex Knight) I.Williams
- Leucadendron macowanii E.Phillips
- Leucadendron meridianum T.M.Salter ex I.Williams
- Leucadendron meyerianum H.Buek ex E.Phillips & Hutch.
- Leucadendron microcephalum (Gand.) Gand. & Schinz
- Leucadendron modestum I.Williams
- Leucadendron muirii E.Phillips
- Leucadendron nervosum E.Phillips & Hutch.
- Leucadendron nitidum H.Buek ex Meisn.
- Leucadendron nobile I.Williams
- Leucadendron olens I.Williams
- Leucadendron orientale I.Williams
- Leucadendron osbornei Rourke
- Leucadendron platyspermum R.Br.
- Leucadendron pondoense A.E.van Wyk
- Leucadendron procerum (Salisb. ex Knight) I.Williams
- Leucadendron pubescens R.Br.
- Leucadendron pubibracteolatum I.Williams
- Leucadendron radiatum E.Phillips & Hutch.
- Leucadendron remotum I.Williams
- Leucadendron roodii Bolus
- Leucadendron rourkei I.Williams
- Leucadendron rubrum Burm.f.
- Leucadendron salicifolium (Salisb.) I.Williams
- Leucadendron salignum P.J.Bergius
- Leucadendron sericeum R.Br.
- Leucadendron sessile R.Br.
- Leucadendron sheilae I.Williams
- Leucadendron singulare I.Williams
- Leucadendron sorocephalodes E.Phillips & Hutch.
- Leucadendron spirale (Salisb. ex Knight) I.Williams
- Leucadendron spissifolium (Salisb. ex Knight) I.Williams
- Leucadendron stellare (Sims) R.Br. ex Steud.
- Leucadendron stelligerum I.Williams
- Leucadendron strobilinum (L.) Druce
- Leucadendron teretifolium (Andrews) I.Williams
- Leucadendron thymifolium (Salisb. ex Knight) I.Williams
- Leucadendron tinctum I.Williams
- Leucadendron tradouwense I.Williams
- Leucadendron uliginosum R.Br.
- Leucadendron verticillatum (Thunb.) Meisn.
- Leucadendron vinimontis Rebelo
- Leucadendron xanthoconus (Kuntze) K.Schum.

== Hybridization ==
The drive behind the production of new Leucadendron cultivars is the production of a constant supply of new and improved quality products that are available initially from South Africa only. The genus Leucadendron is popular amongst consumers due to its colourful bracts and long vase life. Leucadendron hybrids are produced through interspecific hybridization. Crosses made within the same subsection are generally more viable in the hybridization of Leucadendrons with the quantity of seed set relative to the taxonomic relatedness of the species. Intersectional hybridization produces hybrids that show a unique set of characteristics which are favoured by consumers. One example of a hybrid produced by two Leucadendron genera is the cultivar 'Rosette', a hybrid between L. laureolum and L. elimense. This interspecific hybrid is, however, completely sterile due to autopolyploidy and thus has no use in further cultivation. The main aim of interspecific hybridization is to produce large quantities of progeny seed from the best interspecific hybrid parents.

In the UK the cultivars 'Safari Sunset' and 'Inca Gold' have gained the Royal Horticultural Society's Award of Garden Merit.
