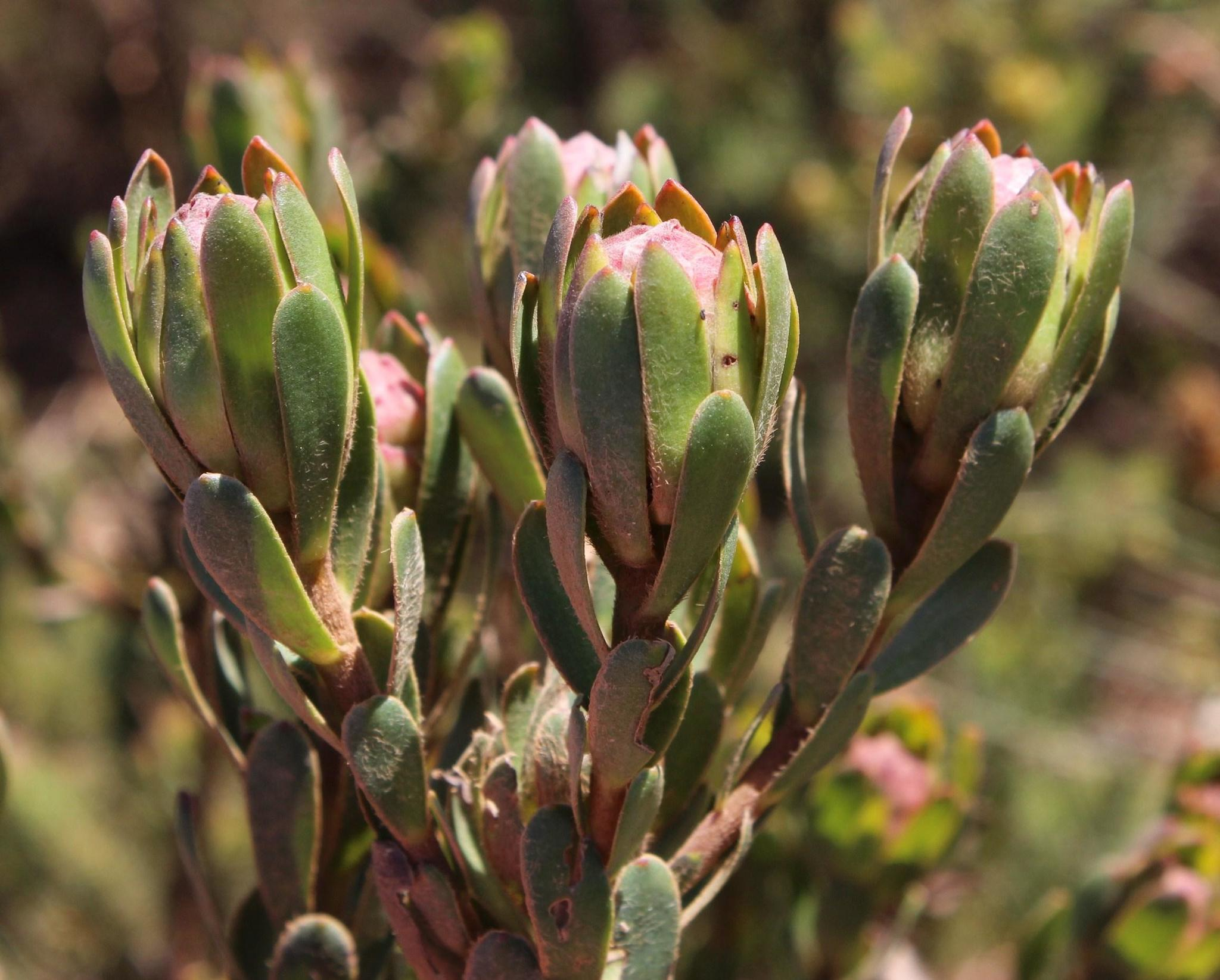

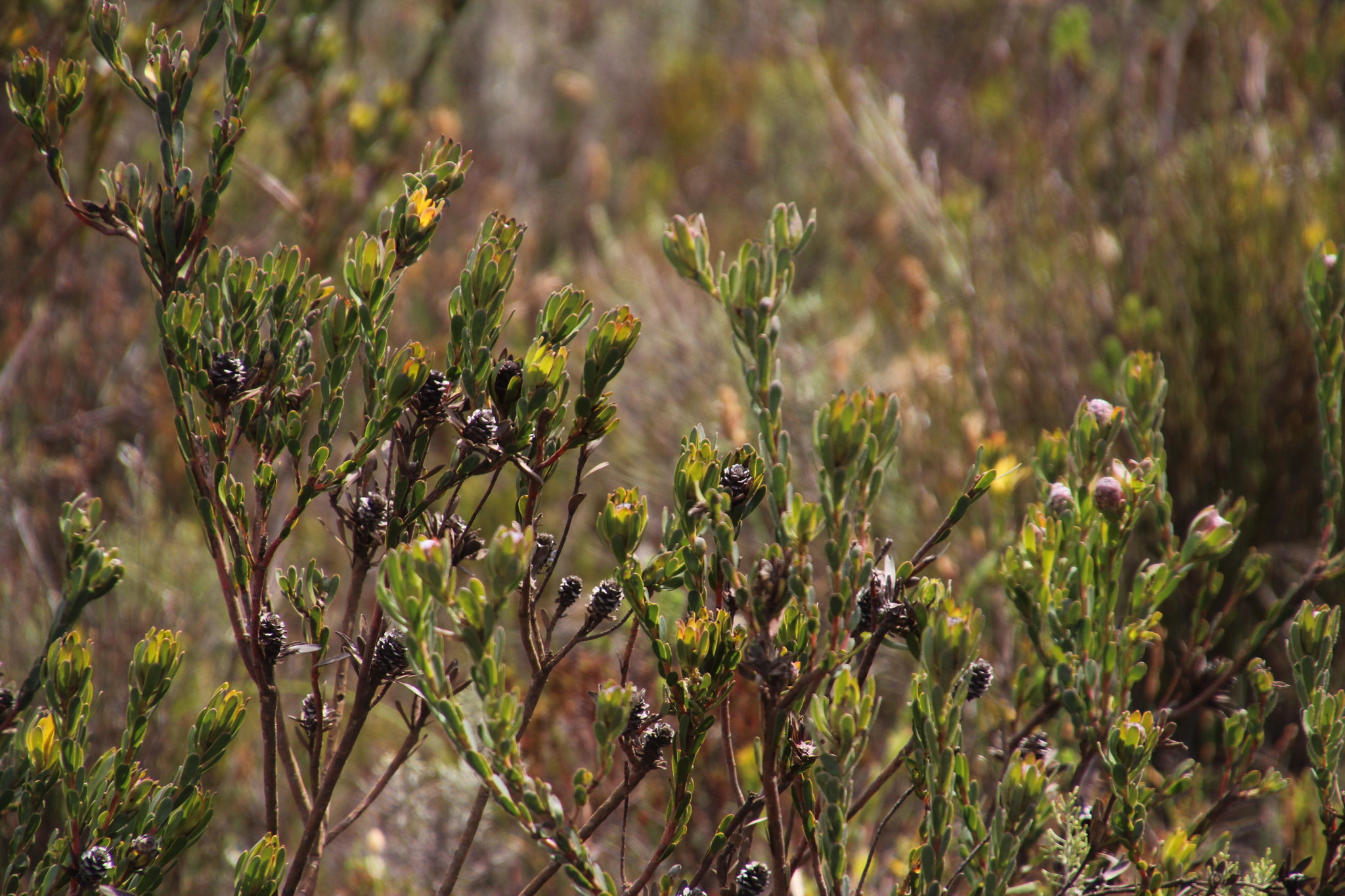

Conservation status
- Endangered (IUCN 3.1)

Scientific classification
- Kingdom: Plantae
- Clade: Tracheophytes
- Clade: Angiosperms
- Clade: Eudicots
- Order: Proteales
- Family: Proteaceae
- Genus: Leucadendron
- Species: L. stelligerum

Binomial name
- Leucadendron stelligerum I.Williams

= Leucadendron stelligerum =

Species of plant

Leucadendron stelligerum, the Agulhas conebush, is a flower-bearing shrub that belongs to the genus Leucadendron and forms part of the fynbos. The plant is native to the Western Cape where it occurs from Elim to the Agulhas Plain.

The shrub grows 2 m tall and flowers from July to August. The plant dies after a fire but the seeds survive. The seeds are stored in a toll on the female plant and fall to the ground after a fire, possibly spreading by the wind. The plant is unisexual and there are separate plants with male and female flowers, which are pollinated by the action of insects. The plant grows on slopes in clayey soil at heights of 20 to 140 m.

In Afrikaans it is known as Agulhastolbos.
