= Leucadendron sericeum =

Conservation status
- Endangered (IUCN 3.1)

Scientific classification
- Kingdom: Plantae
- Clade: Embryophytes
- Clade: Tracheophytes
- Clade: Spermatophytes
- Clade: Angiosperms
- Clade: Eudicots
- Order: Proteales
- Family: Proteaceae
- Genus: Leucadendron
- Species: L. sericeum

Binomial name
- Leucadendron sericeum (Thunb.) R.Br.

Species of plant

Leucadendron sericeum, the Wabooms conebush, is a flower-bearing shrub belonging to the genus Leucadendron and forms part of the fynbos. The plant is native to the Western Cape, South Africa.

== Description ==
The shrub grows 1.0 m (3.3 ft) tall and flowers from May to September. The plant dies after a fire but the seeds survive. The seeds are stored in a toll on the female plant and only fall to the ground where they are spread by ants after two months, after the fruit has ripened. The plant is unisexual and there are separate plants with male and female flowers, which are pollinated by small insects.

In Afrikaans, it is known as waboomsriviertolbos.

== Distribution and habitat ==
The plant occurs at the Wabooms River in the Kouebokkeveld Mountains. The plant grows mainly in sandstone soil at altitudes of 900–920 m (2,950–3,020 ft).
