= Leucadendron cryptocephalum =

Conservation status
- Endangered (IUCN 3.1)

Scientific classification
- Kingdom: Plantae
- Clade: Tracheophytes
- Clade: Angiosperms
- Clade: Eudicots
- Order: Proteales
- Family: Proteaceae
- Genus: Leucadendron
- Species: L. cryptocephalum

Binomial name
- Leucadendron cryptocephalum Guthrie

Species of plant

Leucadendron cryptocephalum, the concealed conebush, is a flower-bearing shrub that belongs to the genus Leucadendron and forms part of the fynbos. The plant is native to the Western Cape and only two populations occur at Potberg and the Groenlandberg. There is little information available about the plant.

The shrub grows 2 m tall and flowers from March to May. The plant dies in a fire but the seeds survive. The seeds are stored in a toll on the female plant. The plant is unisexual and there are separate male and female plants with their flowers. The plant grows at elevations of 60–360 m.

In Afrikaans it is known as the wegkruipertje-tolbos.
