= Leucadendron osbornei =

Conservation status
- Least Concern (IUCN 3.1)

Scientific classification
- Kingdom: Plantae
- Clade: Tracheophytes
- Clade: Angiosperms
- Clade: Eudicots
- Order: Proteales
- Family: Proteaceae
- Genus: Leucadendron
- Species: L. osbornei

Binomial name
- Leucadendron osbornei Rourke

Species of plant

Leucadendron osbornei, the Laingsburg conebush, is a flower-bearing shrub belonging to the genus Leucadendron and forms part of the fynbos. The plant was discovered by David Osborne and is native to the Western Cape, South Africa.

== Description ==
The shrub grows 3 m (9.8 ft) tall and flowers in October. The plant dies in a fire but the seeds survive. The seeds are stored in a toll on the female plant and fall to the ground after a fire where they are spread by the wind; the seeds have small wings. The plant is unisexual and there are separate plants with male and female flowers, which are pollinated by small beetles.

In Afrikaans, it is known as laingsburgtolbos.

== Distribution and habitat ==
The plant is found on the Elandsberg, Anysberg, Touwsberg, and Matjiesgoedberg in the Klein Karoo. The plant grows mainly in sandy soil at altitudes of 800–1,600 m (2,600–5,200 ft).
