= Leucadendron cinereum =

Conservation status
- Vulnerable (IUCN 3.1)

Scientific classification
- Kingdom: Plantae
- Clade: Tracheophytes
- Clade: Angiosperms
- Clade: Eudicots
- Order: Proteales
- Family: Proteaceae
- Genus: Leucadendron
- Species: L. cinereum

Binomial name
- Leucadendron cinereum (Sol. ex Aiton) R.Br.

Species of plant

Leucadendron cinereum, the scraggly conebush, is a flower-bearing shrub that belongs to the genus Leucadendron and forms part of the fynbos. The plant is native to the Western Cape where it occurs from Hopefield and on the Cape Flats from the Berg River estuary to Kraaifontein.

The shrub grows 1 m tall and flowers in October. The plant dies after a fire but the seeds survive. The seeds are stored in a toll on the female plant and fall to the ground after a fire, possibly spreading by the wind. The plant is unisexual and there are separate plants with male and female flowers, which are pollinated by the action of insects. The plant grows on level, sandy soil at altitudes of 15 to 100 m.

In Afrikaans it is known as vaalknopbos.
