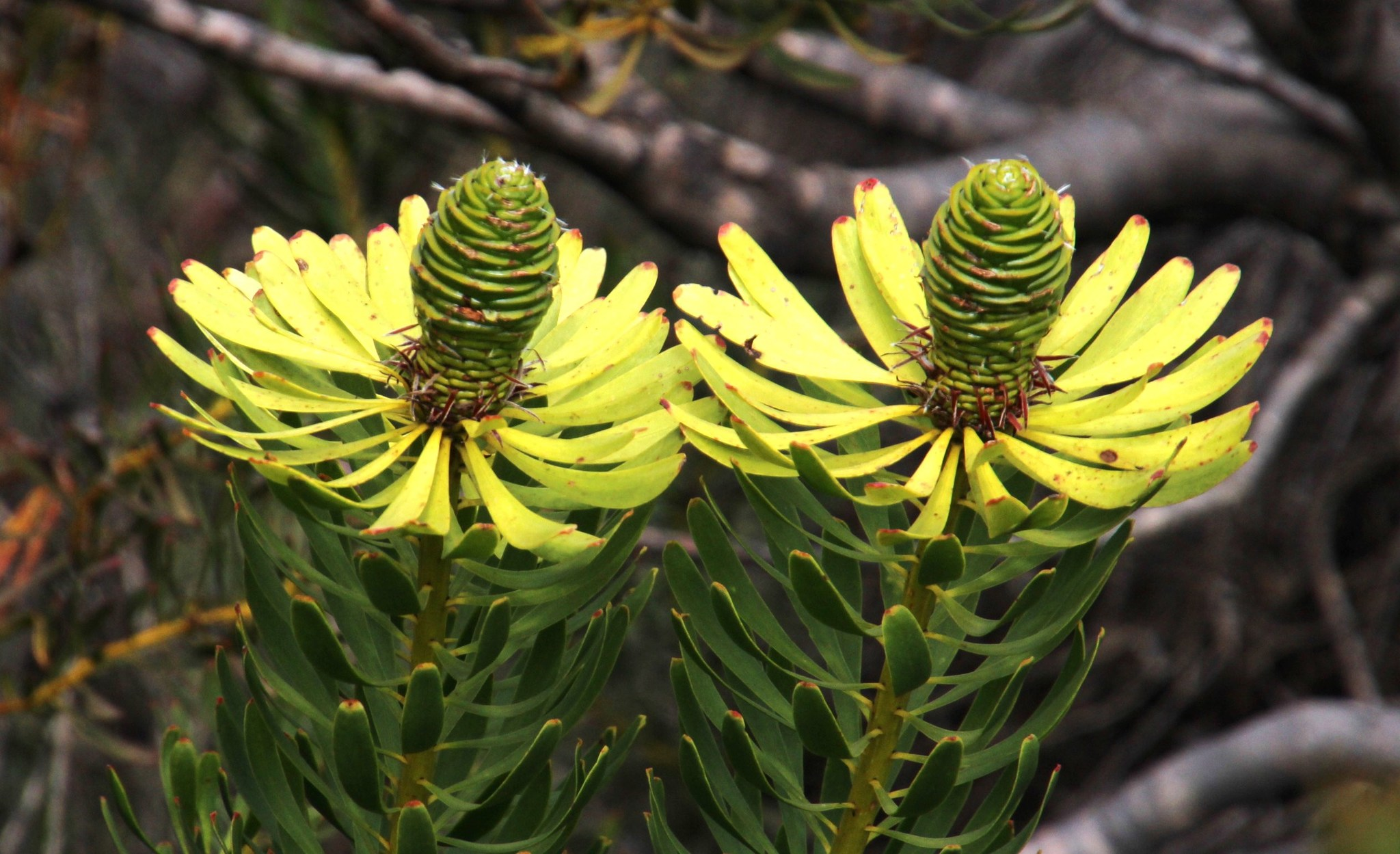

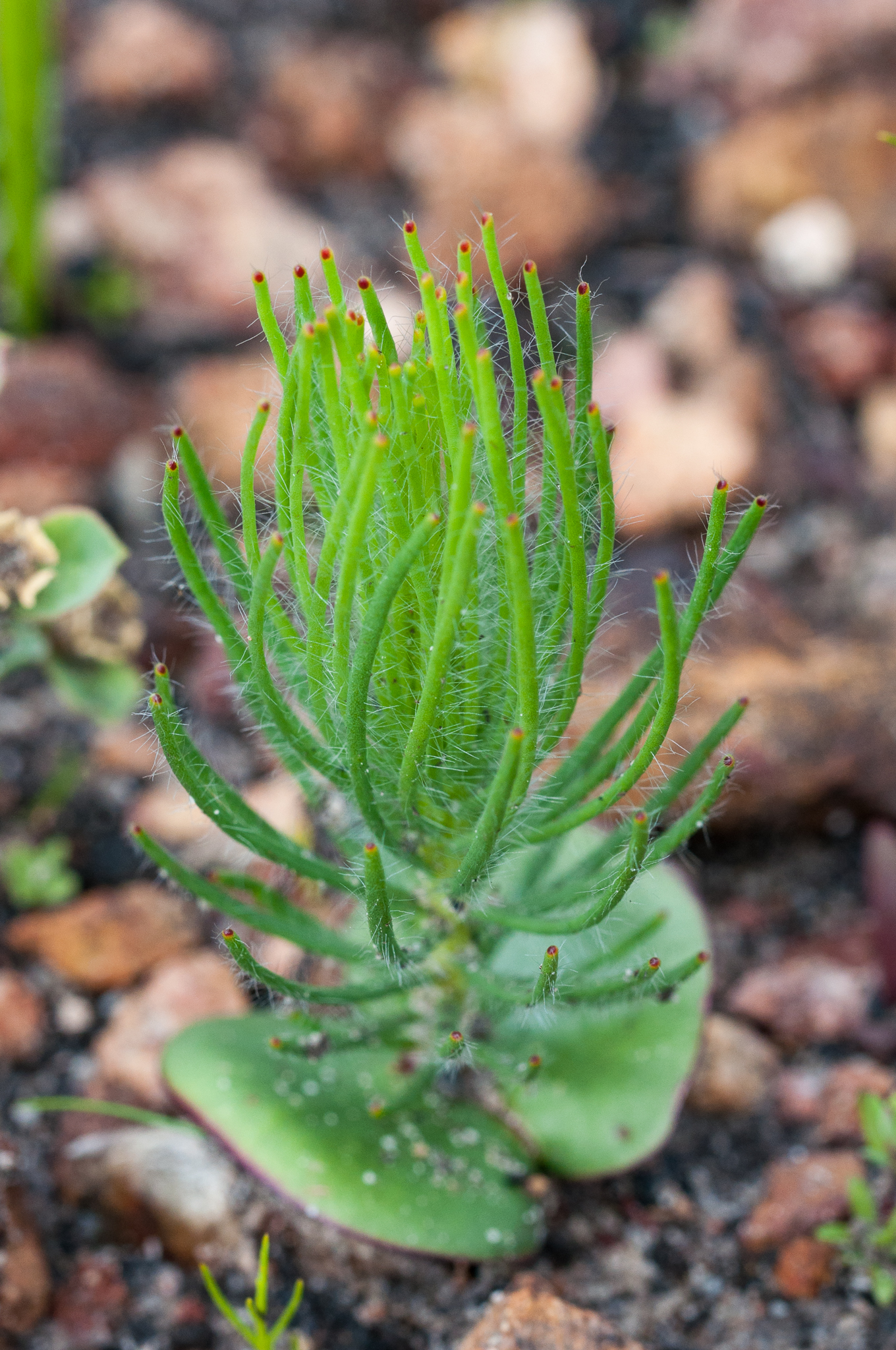
- L. platyspermum sprouting from seed.

Conservation status
- Least Concern (IUCN 3.1)

Scientific classification
- Kingdom: Plantae
- Clade: Tracheophytes
- Clade: Angiosperms
- Clade: Eudicots
- Order: Proteales
- Family: Proteaceae
- Genus: Leucadendron
- Species: L. platyspermum

Binomial name
- Leucadendron platyspermum R.Br.

Synonyms
- Protea platysperma (R.Br.) Kunze; Protea polysperma Poir.

= Leucadendron platyspermum =

Species of plant

Leucadendron platyspermum, commonly referred to as the plate-seed conebush, is a flower-bearing shrub belonging to the genus Leucadendron. It forms part of the fynbos biome. The plant is native to the Western Cape province in South Africa.

== Description ==
The plate-seed conebush shrub grows 1.7 m (5.6 ft) tall and flowers in December. The plant dies after a fire, but the seeds survive. The seeds are stored in a toll on the female plant and only fall to the ground after the first autumn rain after a fire. The seeds have wings and are spread by the wind. The plant is unisexual, and there are separate plants with male and female flowers, which are pollinated by the wind. The plant grows mainly in sandy and shale soil at altitudes of 0–1,350 m (0–4,429 ft).

In Afrikaans, it is known as Kraaltolbos.
