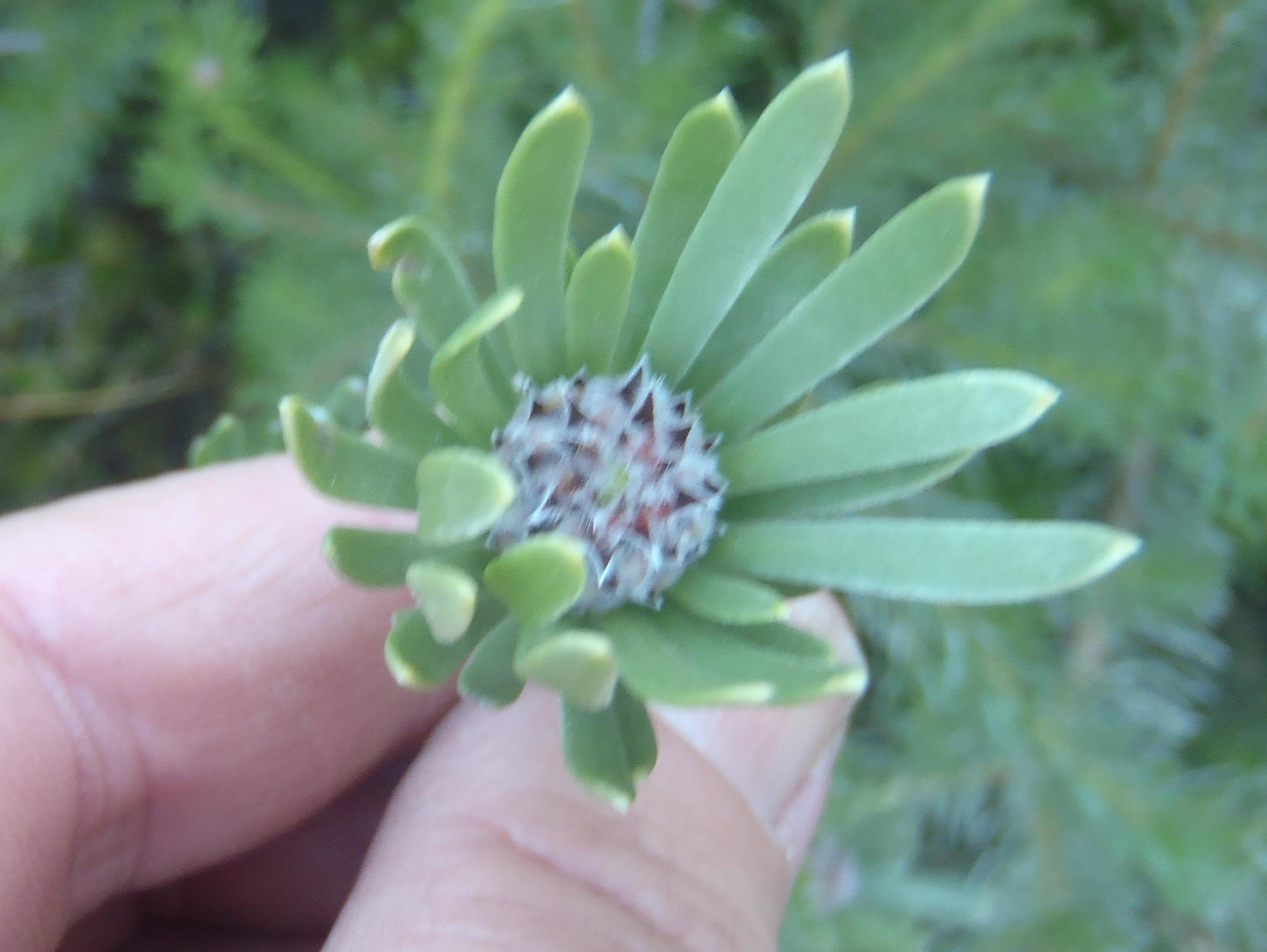

Conservation status
- Vulnerable (IUCN 3.1)

Scientific classification
- Kingdom: Plantae
- Clade: Tracheophytes
- Clade: Angiosperms
- Clade: Eudicots
- Order: Proteales
- Family: Proteaceae
- Genus: Leucadendron
- Species: L. singulare

Binomial name
- Leucadendron singulare I.Williams

= Leucadendron singulare =

Species of plant

Leucadendron singulare, the Kammanassie conebush, is a flower-bearing shrub belonging to the genus Leucadendron and forms part of the fynbos. The plant is native to the Western Cape where it occurs in the Mannetjiesberg in the Kammanassie Mountains. The plant is rare. The shrub grows only 30 cm high and spreads out. It blooms in October. The plant dies after a fire, but the seeds survive. The seeds are stored in a toll on the female plant and fall out of the toll to the ground after two months where they are spread by ants. The plant is single-faced and there are separate plants with male and female flowers, which are pollinated by insects. The plant grows in crevices on peaks at heights of 2,000 - 2,150 m.

In Afrikaans it is known as Kamanassietolbos.
