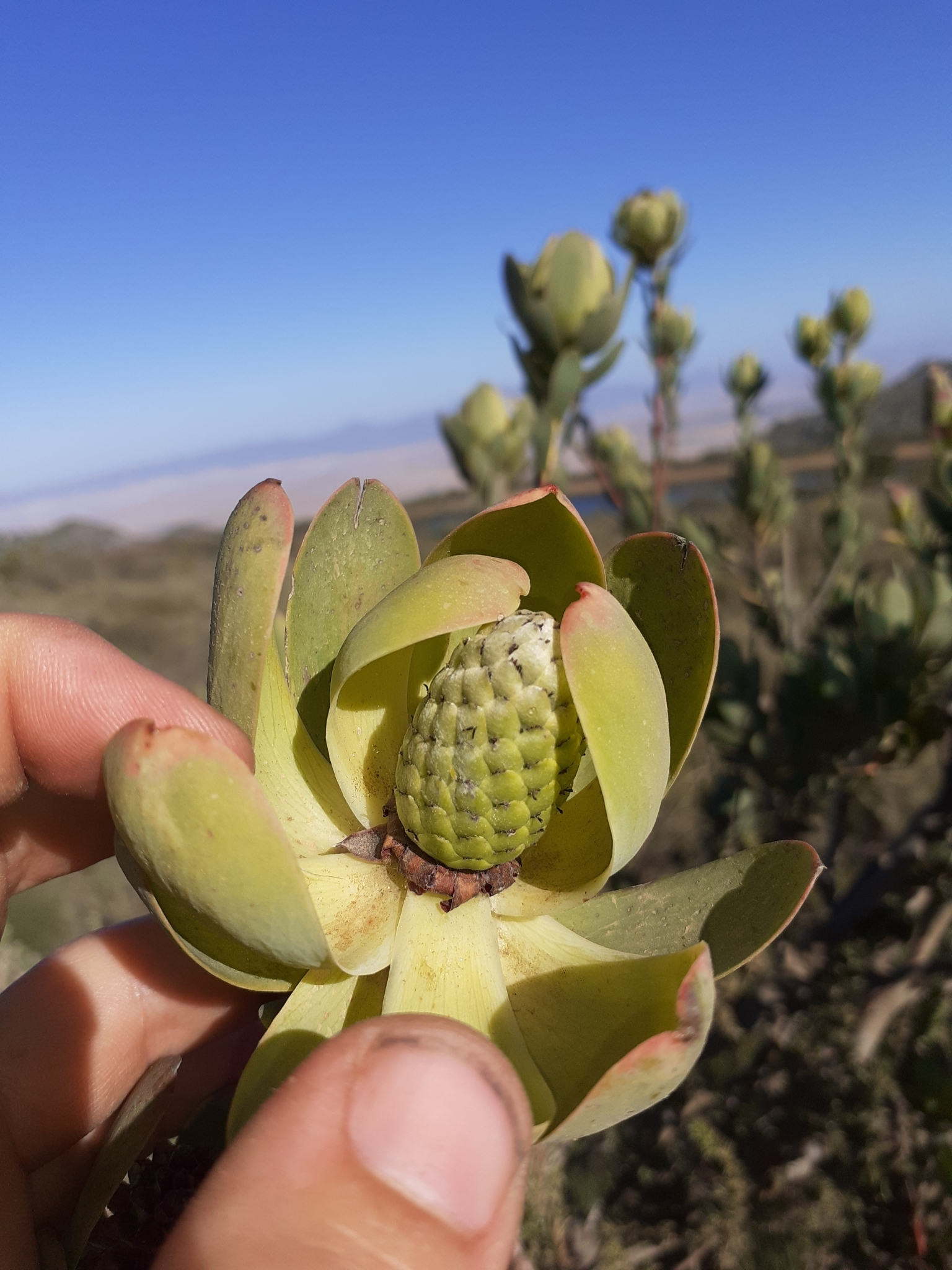

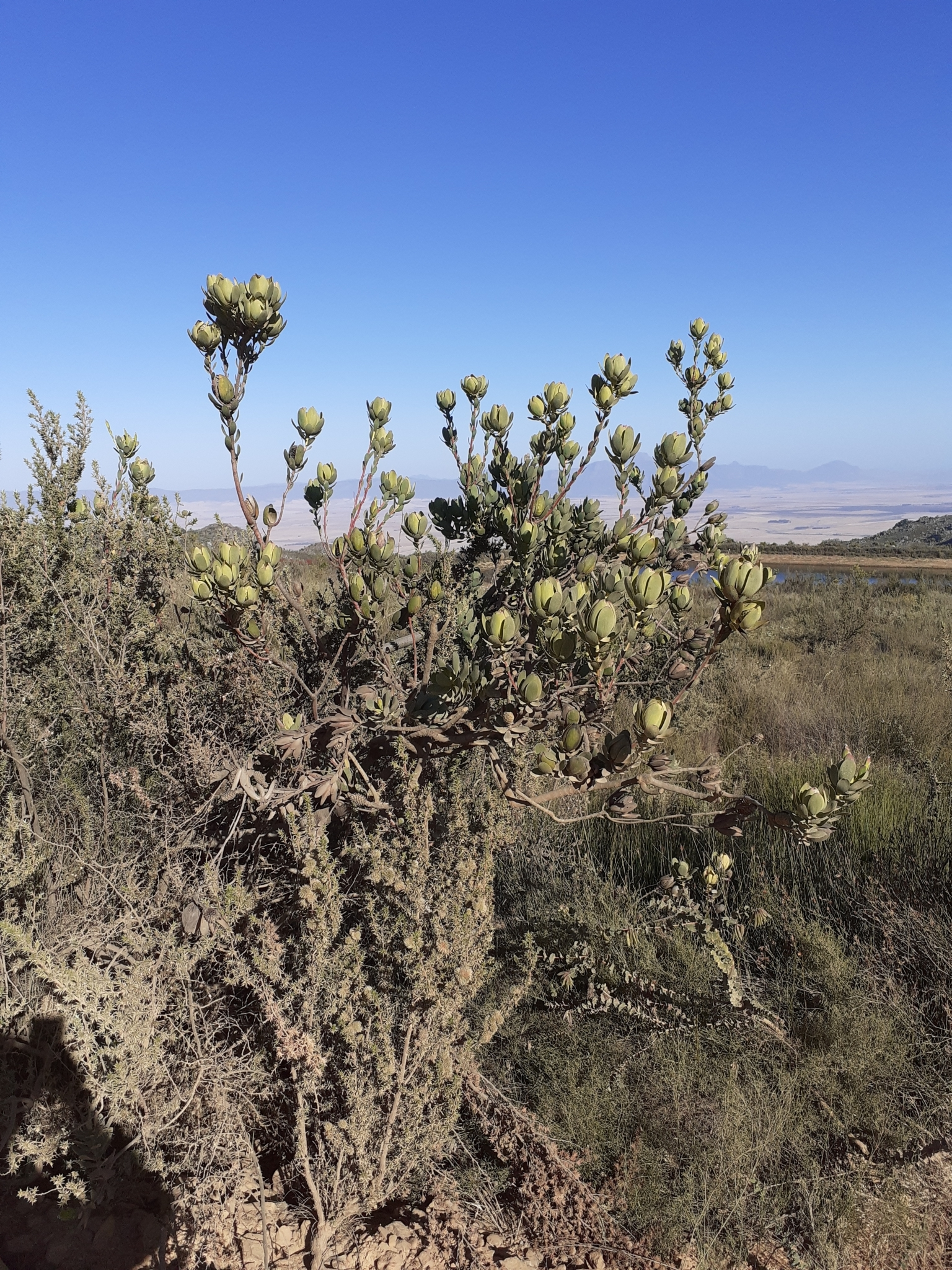

Conservation status
- Least Concern (IUCN 3.1)

Scientific classification
- Kingdom: Plantae
- Clade: Embryophytes
- Clade: Tracheophytes
- Clade: Angiosperms
- Clade: Eudicots
- Order: Proteales
- Family: Proteaceae
- Genus: Leucadendron
- Species: L. diemontianum

Binomial name
- Leucadendron diemontianum I.Williams

= Leucadendron diemontianum =

Species of plant

Leucadendron diemontianum, the Visgat conebush, is a flower-bearing shrub belonging to the genus Leucadendron and forms part of the fynbos. The plant is native to the Western Cape where it occurs on the foothills of the Great Winterhoek Mountains at Visgat, Onderboskloof and Rosendal as well as at Heuningvlei in the northern Cederberg.

The shrub grows 2.2 m tall and flowers in June. The plant dies in a fire but the seeds survive. The seeds are stored in a toll on the female plant and fall to the ground after a fire and are spread by the wind, the seeds have wings. The plant is unisexual and there are separate plants with male and female flowers, which are pollinated by small beetles. The plant grows mainly in sand blown by the wind at altitudes of 0 – 300 m.

In Afrikaans it is known as Visgattolbos.

== Gallery ==
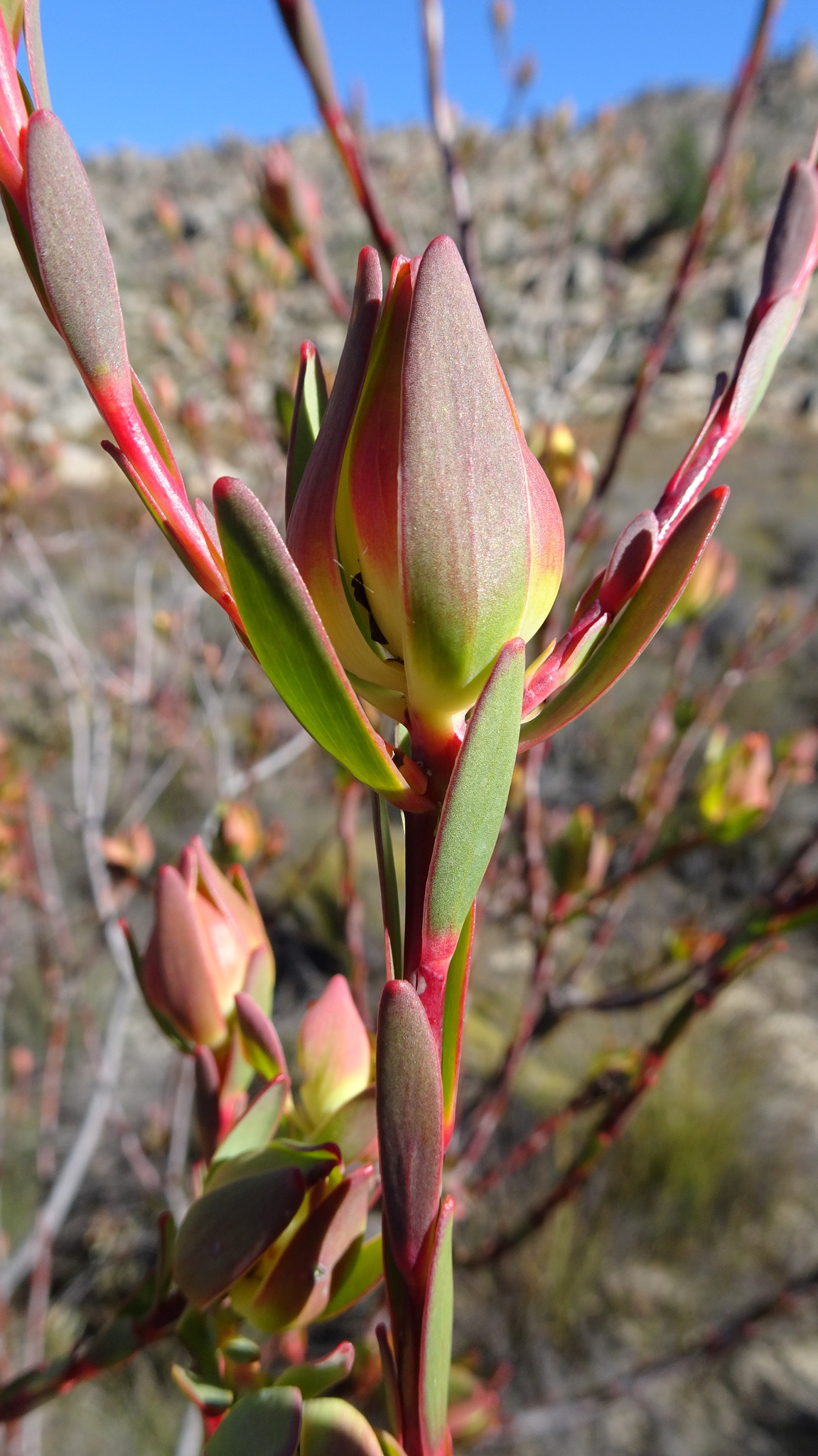
