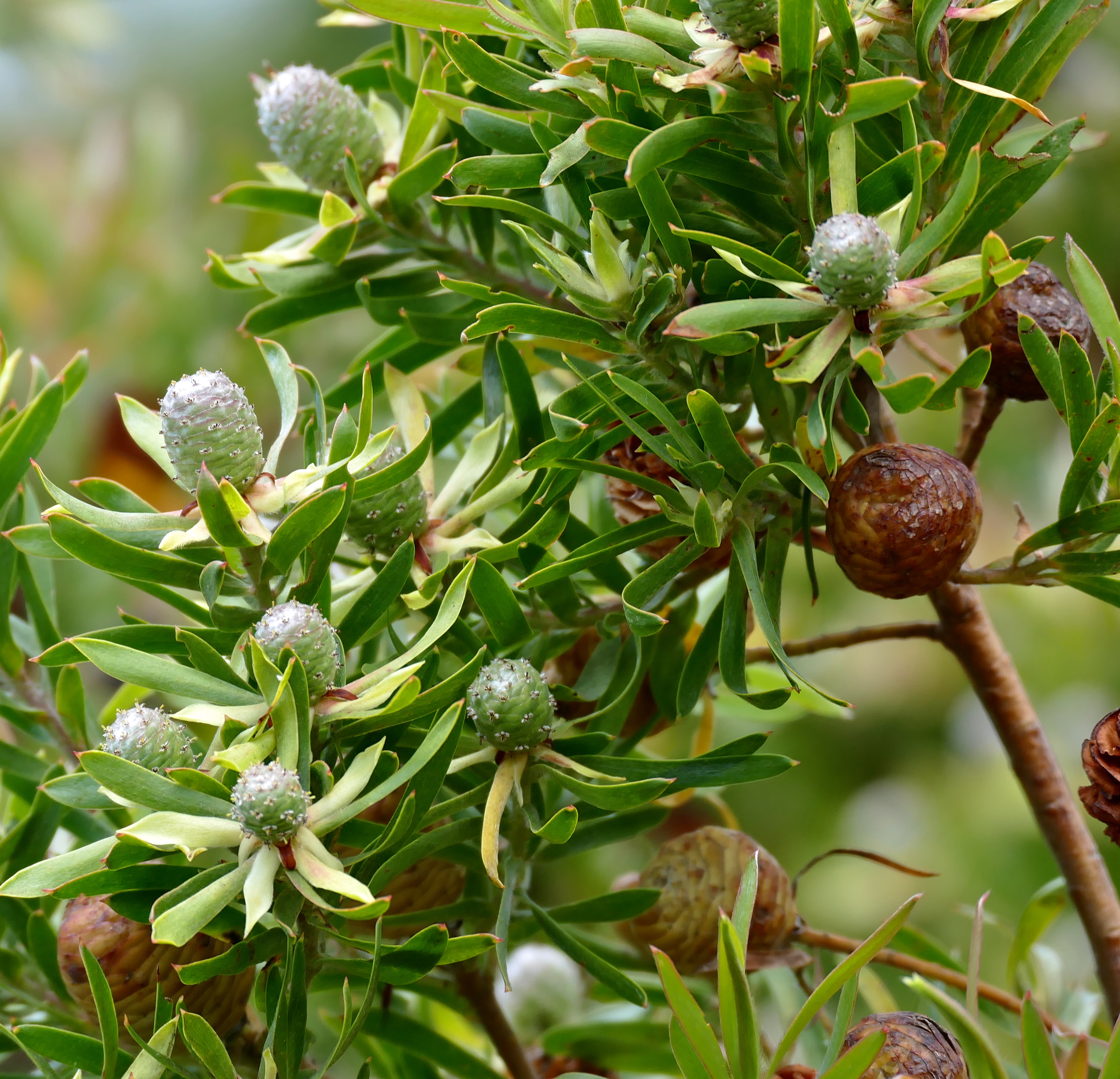

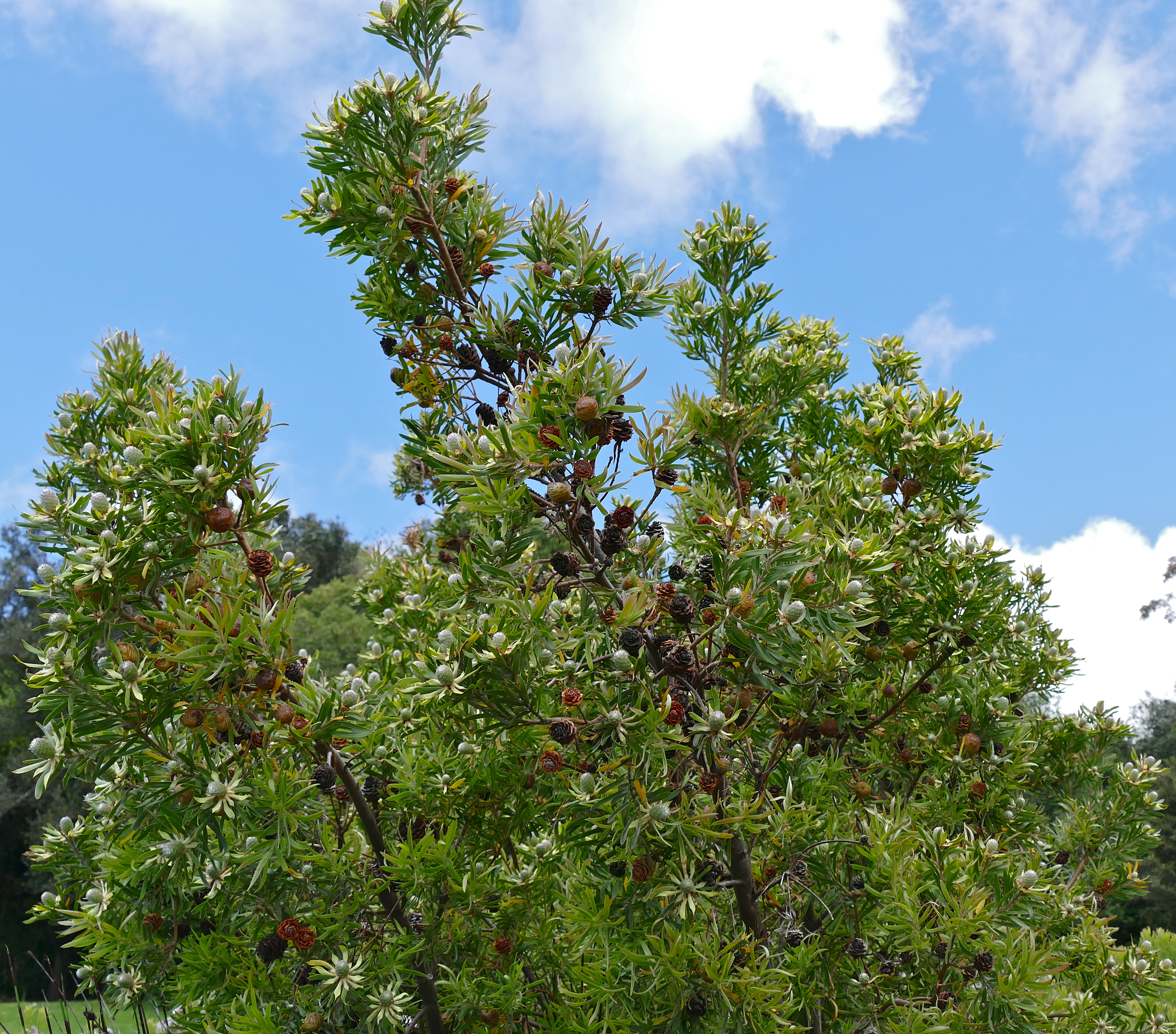

Conservation status
- Endangered (IUCN 3.1)

Scientific classification
- Kingdom: Plantae
- Clade: Tracheophytes
- Clade: Angiosperms
- Clade: Eudicots
- Order: Proteales
- Family: Proteaceae
- Genus: Leucadendron
- Species: L. floridum

Binomial name
- Leucadendron floridum R.Br.

= Leucadendron floridum =

Species of plant

Leucadendron floridum, the flats conebush, is a flower-bearing shrub belonging to the genus Leucadendron and forms part of the fynbos. The plant is native to the Western Cape, where it occurs in the Cape Flats, from Rondebosch to Kuils River and also in the Cape Peninsula around most wetlands. The shrub grows 2 m tall and bears flowers from September to October.

Fire destroys the plant but the seeds survive. The seeds are stored in a toll on the female plant and fall from the toll to the ground and can be spread by the wind. The plant is unisexual and there are male and female plants. Pollination finds through the wind. The plant grows mainly in water-saturated soil at 10–200 m.

In Afrikaans it is known as vlaktetolbos.

== Sources ==
- http://redlist.sanbi.org/species.php?species=794-49
- http://pza.sanbi.org/leucadendron-floridum
- http://biodiversityexplorer.info/plants/proteaceae/leucadendron_floridum.htm
- https://www.proteaatlas.org.za/conebu.htm
