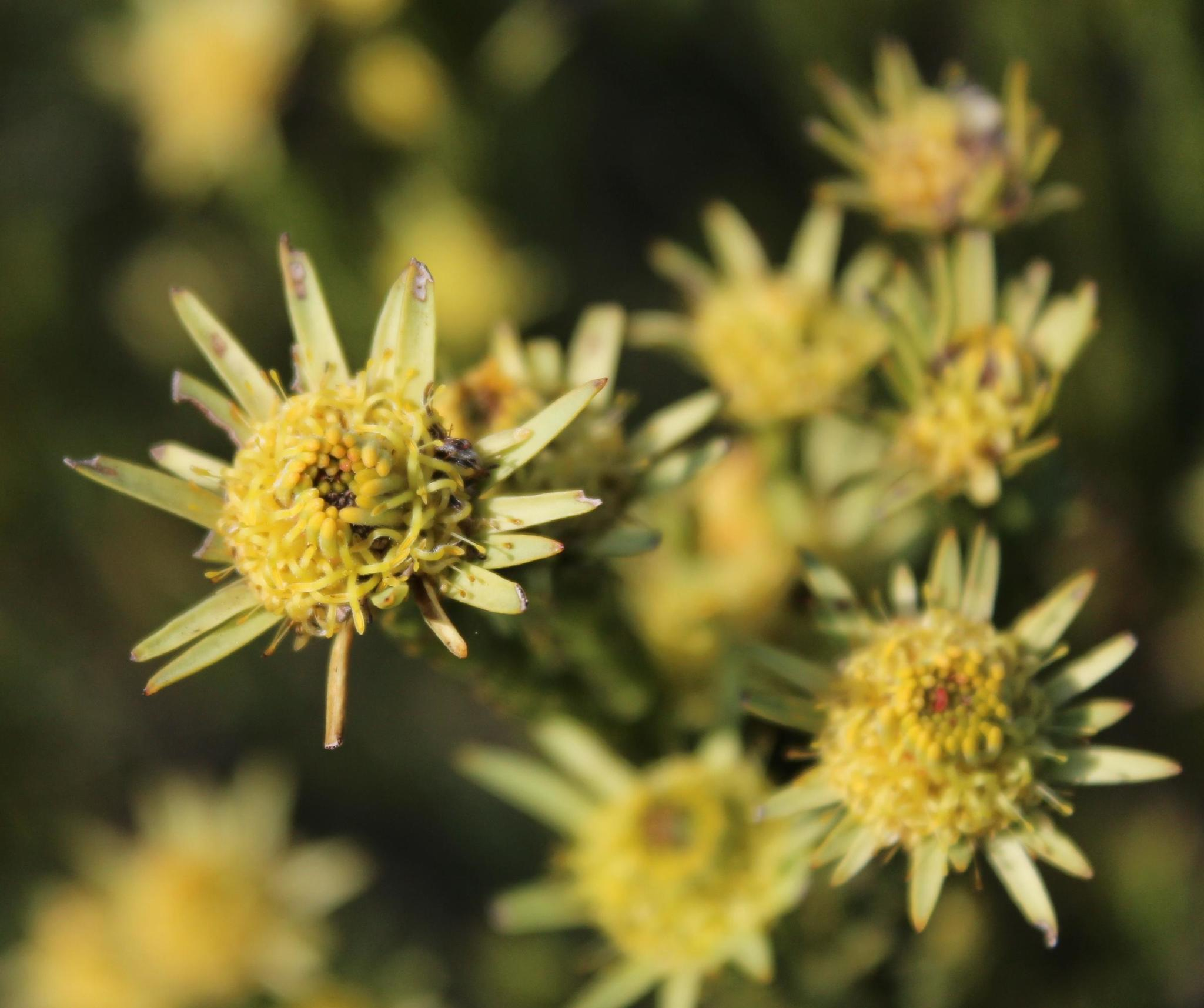

Conservation status
- Endangered (IUCN 3.1)

Scientific classification
- Kingdom: Plantae
- Clade: Tracheophytes
- Clade: Angiosperms
- Clade: Eudicots
- Order: Proteales
- Family: Proteaceae
- Genus: Leucadendron
- Species: L. stellare

Binomial name
- Leucadendron stellare (Sims) Sweet

= Leucadendron stellare =

Species of plant

Leucadendron stellare, the star conebush, is a flower-bearing shrub belonging to the genus Leucadendron. It forms part of the fynbos biome. The plant is native to the Western Cape where it occurs from the Cape Flats to the Berg River Valley and plains at Aurora.

The shrub grows 2 m tall and flowers from September to October. The plant sprouts again after a fire. The seeds are stored in a toll on the female plant and fall from the toll to the ground after two months. The plant is unisexual and there are separate plants with male and female flowers, which are pollinated by insects. The plant grows mainly on level areas, in dry sand over clay soil at heights of 30 – 170 m.

In Afrikaans it is known as Stertolbos.
