= Leucadendron sheilae =

Conservation status
- Near Threatened (IUCN 3.1)

Scientific classification
- Kingdom: Plantae
- Clade: Embryophytes
- Clade: Tracheophytes
- Clade: Spermatophytes
- Clade: Angiosperms
- Clade: Eudicots
- Order: Proteales
- Family: Proteaceae
- Genus: Leucadendron
- Species: L. sheilae

Binomial name
- Leucadendron sheilae (Salisb.) I.Williams

Species of flowering plant

Leucadendron sheilae, the Lokenberg conebush, is a flower-bearing shrub that belongs to the genus Leucadendron and forms part of the fynbos, a South African biogeographical region. The plant is native to the Western and Northern Capes, where it occurs at Lokenberg in the Bokkeveld Mountains. The plant grows mainly in hard sandstone sand on level crests at altitudes of 600 to 900 metres (2,000–3,000 ft). In Afrikaans it is known as Lokenberg-tolbos.

Description
L. sheilae is a small shrub with narrow leaves which are widest near their tips (oblanceolate). The male flowers are small and green, with a foetid scent. The female flowers, also green, are roughly spherical (or "globose") florets which cluster together in larger inflorescences borne on hairless stems.

Reproduction
The shrub is dioecious (individual plants have either all male or all female flowers), with unisexual flowers which are pollinated by insects.

Spread
L. sheilae plants die after fire; the seeds survive. The seeds are borne in cones on the female plant and are released when ripe. Rodents collect the ripe seed and store in underground caches, which protects the seed from fire.
