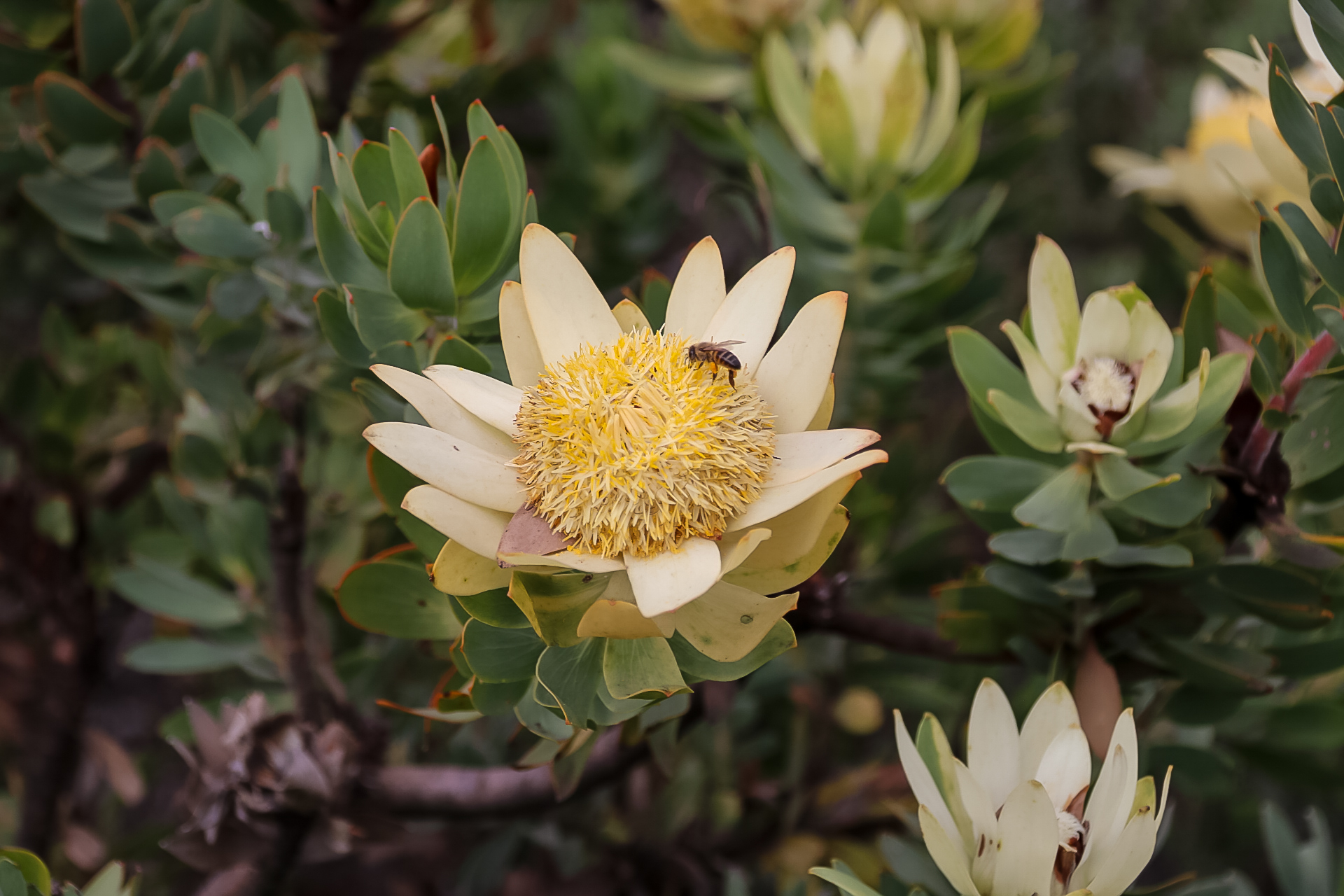

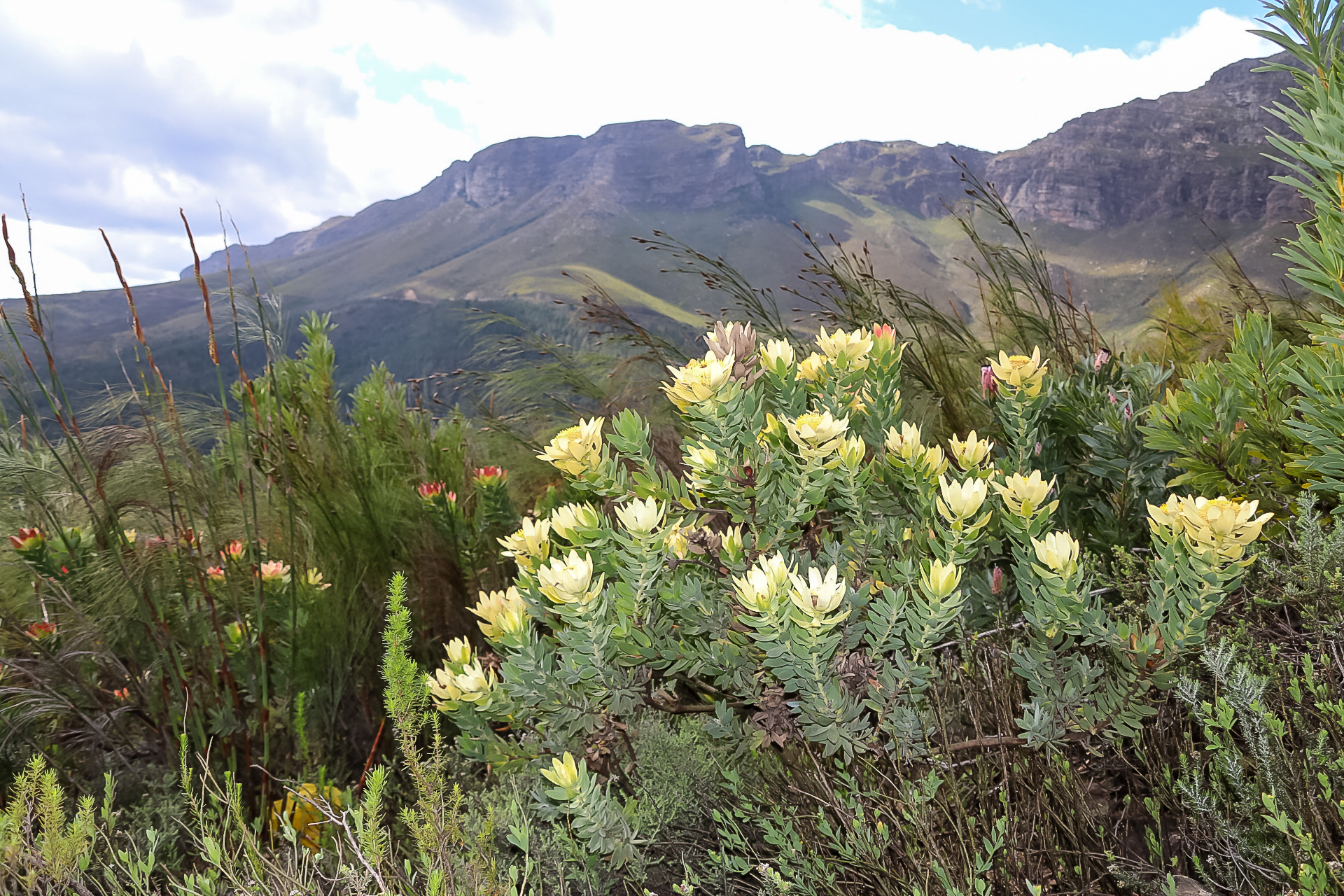

Conservation status
- Near Threatened (IUCN 3.1)

Scientific classification
- Kingdom: Plantae
- Clade: Tracheophytes
- Clade: Angiosperms
- Clade: Eudicots
- Order: Proteales
- Family: Proteaceae
- Genus: Leucadendron
- Species: L. daphnoides

Binomial name
- Leucadendron daphnoides (Thunb.) Meisn.

= Leucadendron daphnoides =

Species of plant

Leucadendron daphnoides, the Du Toit's Kloof conebush, is a flower-bearing shrub in the genus Leucadendron and forms part of the fynbos. The plant is native to the Western Cape and occurs in the Slanghoek, Du Toits, and Stettynskloof mountains. The shrub grows up to 1.5 m tall and flowers from July to September.

In Afrikaans, it is known as reusepoeierkwas.
