= Gauteng Shale Mountain Bushveld =

South African vegetation type in Gauteng and North West

Gauteng Shale Mountain Bushveld (code SVcb 10) is a South African vegetation type in the Savanna biome, occurring mainly on shale and mudstone ridges in Gauteng and adjacent eastern parts of the North West province. It was formalised in the national vegetation classification published by the South African National Biodiversity Institute (SANBI), and later refined through subsequent revisions of the National Vegetation Map of South Africa.

In the national terrestrial Red List of Ecosystems, Gauteng Shale Mountain Bushveld is assessed as Least Concern. SANBI's 2021 technical report gave it a modelled original extent of about 1,024.99 km^{2} and a remaining extent of about 702.59 km^{2} in 2018, and listed it as endemic to South Africa. Although it is not currently listed as a threatened ecosystem nationally, national planning sources have continued to treat it as under-protected within the formal protected-area network.

== Geography ==
Gauteng Shale Mountain Bushveld is distributed in a discontinuous belt of rocky uplands in Gauteng and eastern North West. Recent revision work describes its main occurrences as the Gatsrand south of Carletonville–Westonaria–Lenasia, the Moot area of the Magaliesberg between Pretoria and Tarlton, and shale hills south of Koster. The type is mainly found between about 1,300 and 1,750 m above sea level.

== Geology and soils ==
The vegetation type is associated with sedimentary shale and mudstone ridges and hills, and is structurally similar to Andesite Mountain Bushveld but differentiated chiefly by geology. It typically occupies low, broken ridges of varying steepness with high surface rock cover, and supports a short, semi-open woody thicket or woodland, usually about 3–6 m tall.

Published South African vegetation work has long treated this vegetation as part of the broader shale-based mountain bushveld / Bankenveld complex of the southern Bushveld margin, rather than as a separate global ecoregion concept; The vegetation now called Gauteng Shale Mountain Bushveld emerged from the long history of Bankenveld and ridge-vegetation research in Gauteng and the southern Bushveld margin. The formal code SVcb 10 was established in the 2006 national vegetation map and vegetation classification edited by Mucina and Rutherford. The VEGMAP project subsequently refined the national map in 2009, 2012 and especially 2018, with the 2018 revision described by Dayaram and colleagues as the most substantial update since 2006.

In 2021 SANBI incorporated the vegetation type into the revised terrestrial Red List of Ecosystems, retaining it as Least Concern but providing updated extent statistics and confirming its endemic status. In 2024, Desmet and co-authors further refined the western portion of its mapped distribution in the North West province, clarifying its distinction from geologically similar Andesite Mountain Bushveld and emphasizing its role within the broader bankenveld / mountain-bushveld complex.

== Climate ==
Gauteng Shale Mountain Bushveld lies in South Africa's summer-rainfall interior. In the adjacent eastern North West and Gauteng uplands, rainfall is concentrated in the warm season, mainly from October to April, with cooler and often frost-prone winters on the Highveld. Because the vegetation type occupies the eastern, higher and more dissected part of the regional gradient, it is climatically closer to the cooler Highveld / Bankenveld transition than to the hotter, lower-lying bushveld further north and west.

== Flora ==
The vegetation is a woody, rocky bushveld with a well-developed grass layer. Representative dominant or frequent woody species listed in recent revision work include Senegalia caffra, Celtis africana, Searsia leptodictya, Vangueria infausta, Ziziphus mucronata, Cussonia spicata, Ehretia rigida and Gymnosporia buxifolia. Grasses and graminoids recorded as important components include Themeda triandra, Cymbopogon pospischilii, Digitaria eriantha and several other rocky-slope grasses and forbs characteristic of ridge bushveld and Bankenveld landscapes.

Notable plant species associated with GSMB or its rocky ridge habitat include the succulents Delosperma leendertziae and Delosperma gautengense, as well as woody taxa such as Protea afra, Protea welwitschii and the mistletoe Tapinanthus oleifolius. These examples are representative only and do not constitute an exhaustive floristic list.

=== Representative flora and fauna ===
Representative flora and fauna of Gauteng Shale Mountain Bushveld
Group	Taxon	Notes on association with GSMB	Conservation status in source reviewed	Source
Flora	Protea afra subsp. afra	Rocky ridge shrub/tree recorded for GSMB and adjacent bushveld/Bankenveld landscapes	Least Concern	
Flora	Protea welwitschii	Rocky savanna and ridge shrub reported from GSMB-associated landscapes	Least Concern	
Flora	Delosperma leendertziae	Succulent of rocky slopes; SANBI lists GSMB among major habitats	Near Threatened	
Flora	Tapinanthus oleifolius	Mistletoe of dry woodland and bushveld; SANBI lists GSMB among major habitats	Least Concern	
Fauna	Secretarybird (Sagittarius serpentarius)	Open-habitat raptor recorded from GSMB landscapes and cited as a species of concern in recent avifaunal work	Regional Vulnerable; globally Endangered	
Fauna	African grass owl (Tyto capensis)	Regionally threatened bird recorded from Suikerbosrand Nature Reserve and broader grassland-bushveld mosaics	Regional Vulnerable	
Fauna	Cape vulture (Gyps coprotheres)	Important threatened scavenger in the Magaliesberg and wider ridge systems that include GSMB	Regional Vulnerable	
Fauna	Chrysoritis aureus (Heidelberg copper / Highveld golden opal)	Threatened butterfly of Gauteng and Mpumalanga ridge habitats; important in conservation planning on Gauteng mountain systems	Endangered	

== Fauna ==
Vegetation-type-wide faunal syntheses for Gauteng Shale Mountain Bushveld are less explicit in the published literature than floristic descriptions, but reserve inventories and official biodiversity planning documents show that GSMB landscapes support a mixture of rocky-ridge, grassland and bushveld fauna.

Important or representative species recorded in reserves and broader landscapes containing GSMB include the Secretarybird, African grass owl, Cape vulture, and regionally threatened open-country birds such as the white-bellied korhaan. The 2011 national threatened ecosystems list also cited a series of GSMB-containing priority landscapes in Gauteng and adjacent areas as containing threatened mammals, birds, reptiles and invertebrates, including bats, raptors, baboon spiders and scorpions.

== Conservation status ==
SANBI assessed Gauteng Shale Mountain Bushveld as Least Concern in the 2021 terrestrial Red List of Ecosystems, and listed it as endemic to South Africa. The same assessment reported an original extent of 1,024.99 km^{2} and a remaining extent of 702.59 km^{2} in 2018. Protection, however, is relatively limited. Statistics South Africa's protected-area accounts recorded 5,679.3 ha of Gauteng Shale Mountain Bushveld inside protected areas by 2020, equivalent to about 5.5% of its recorded extent. South Africa's National Protected Area Expansion Strategy classified the vegetation type as Poorly Protected.

Provincial conservation planning has nevertheless identified a substantial network of protected areas and critical biodiversity areas that contribute toward representation targets. In the 2014 Gauteng Department of Agriculture and Rural Development conservation plan, Gauteng's proportional target for the type was 20,544 ha, while 20,166 ha occurred within the province's protected-area and critical-biodiversity-area network.

== Threats ==
The main long-term threat to Gauteng Shale Mountain Bushveld is land transformation on rocky ridges and adjacent plains, especially from urban expansion, infrastructure, mining and agriculture. Species-specific assessments within GSMB landscapes also identify habitat fragmentation, invasive alien plants, and disturbance associated with residential development and other edge effects. In broader open-country bird conservation work for the Gauteng–Highveld region, habitat loss and degradation, electricity infrastructure, fencing and disturbance are recurring pressures on species using GSMB mosaics.

Urban protected areas in Gauteng also face pressure from invasive alien plants and surrounding landscape fragmentation, problems that are significant for many ridge vegetation remnants, including GSMB patches where they survive in or near metropolitan areas.

== Protected areas ==
The exact hectarage of Gauteng Shale Mountain Bushveld inside each reserve is generally unspecified in the public sources reviewed. Nevertheless, provincial planning documents and official biodiversity sources make it clear that several protected areas either contain GSMB directly or protect broader rocky-ridge ecosystems in which GSMB is one of the key vegetation features.

Key protected areas associated with Gauteng Shale Mountain Bushveld
Protected area	Reported size	Protection status / governance	Notes on GSMB association	Source
Suikerbosrand Nature Reserve	11,657.60 ha; plus Suikerbosrand extension 6,322.15 ha	Provincial nature reserve	Provincial planning sources list the reserve and its extension as major protected areas in Gauteng; SANBI and BirdLife-linked sources record GSMB-associated ridge flora and fauna in the Suikerbosrand landscape.	
Klipriviersberg Nature Reserve	696.12 ha	Municipal nature reserve	Official threatened-ecosystem documentation for southern Johannesburg cites GSMB among the key vegetation features of the protected landscape.	
Melville Koppies	48.08 ha	Municipal nature reserve	Included in Gauteng's protected-area network; official threatened-ecosystem sources for the broader Witwatersrand/Magaliesberg ridge systems cite GSMB among their key vegetation features. Exact overlap is unspecified.	
Groenkloof Nature Reserve	unspecified in source reviewed here	Nature reserve	Government threatened-ecosystem documentation for the Pretoria–Magaliesberg ridge systems reports protection in Groenkloof Nature Reserve for a broader ecosystem that includes GSMB among its vegetation features. Exact overlap is unspecified.	

== Human use ==
Where it persists near metropolitan areas, Gauteng Shale Mountain Bushveld has important recreational, educational and landscape value. Protected remnants in places such as Klipriviersberg Nature Reserve and Suikerbosrand Nature Reserve are used for hiking, birding, environmental education and nature-based tourism. In planning terms, ridge systems containing GSMB are also important elements of Gauteng's metropolitan open-space and critical-biodiversity-area networks.

At the same time, many GSMB fragments occur in zones of intense historical and contemporary land use, especially around the mining belt and urban edges of Gauteng. This dual role—both as remnant natural habitat and as a landscape under development pressure—has shaped much of the literature on its conservation significance.
