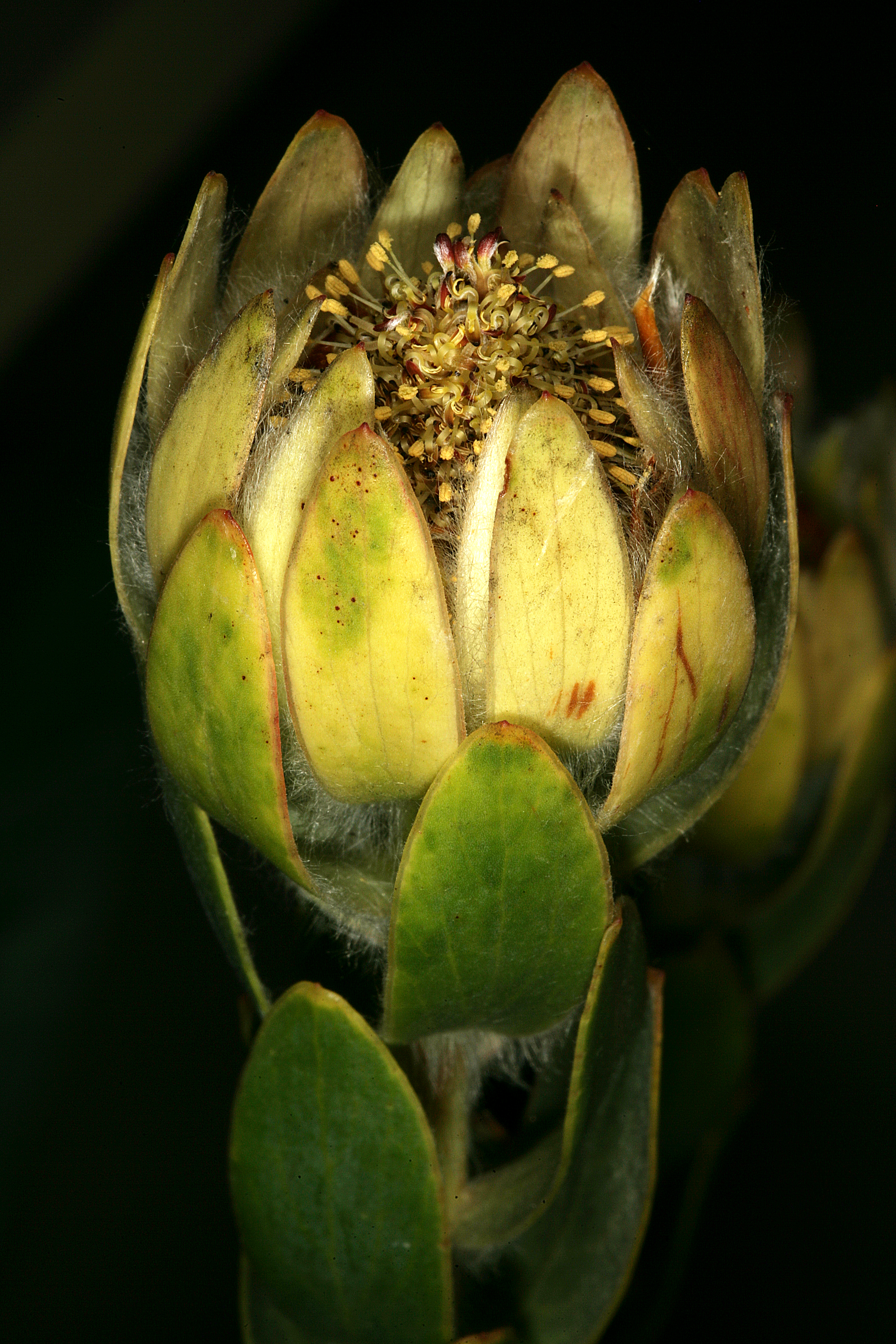

Conservation status
- Least Concern (IUCN 3.1)

Scientific classification
- Kingdom: Plantae
- Clade: Tracheophytes
- Clade: Angiosperms
- Clade: Eudicots
- Order: Proteales
- Family: Proteaceae
- Genus: Leucadendron
- Species: L. nervosum

Binomial name
- Leucadendron nervosum E.Phillips & Hutch.

= Leucadendron nervosum =

Species of flowering plant

Leucadendron nervosum, the silky-ruff conebush, is a flower-bearing shrub that belongs to the family Proteaceae. It is part of the South Africa fynbos vegetation type. The plant is native to the Western Cape, where it occurs on the Jonaskop in the Riviersonderend Mountains and Grootberg in the Langeberg. The shrub grows 1.5 m tall and flowers in September.

Fire destroys the plant but the seeds survive. The seeds are stored in a toll on the female plant and are released after a fire and possibly spread by the wind. The plant is dioecious; there are male and female plants that reproduce by wind pollination. The plant grows on northern slopes at altitudes of 1100-1350 m.

In Afrikaans it is known as Syblaartolbos.

== Gallery ==
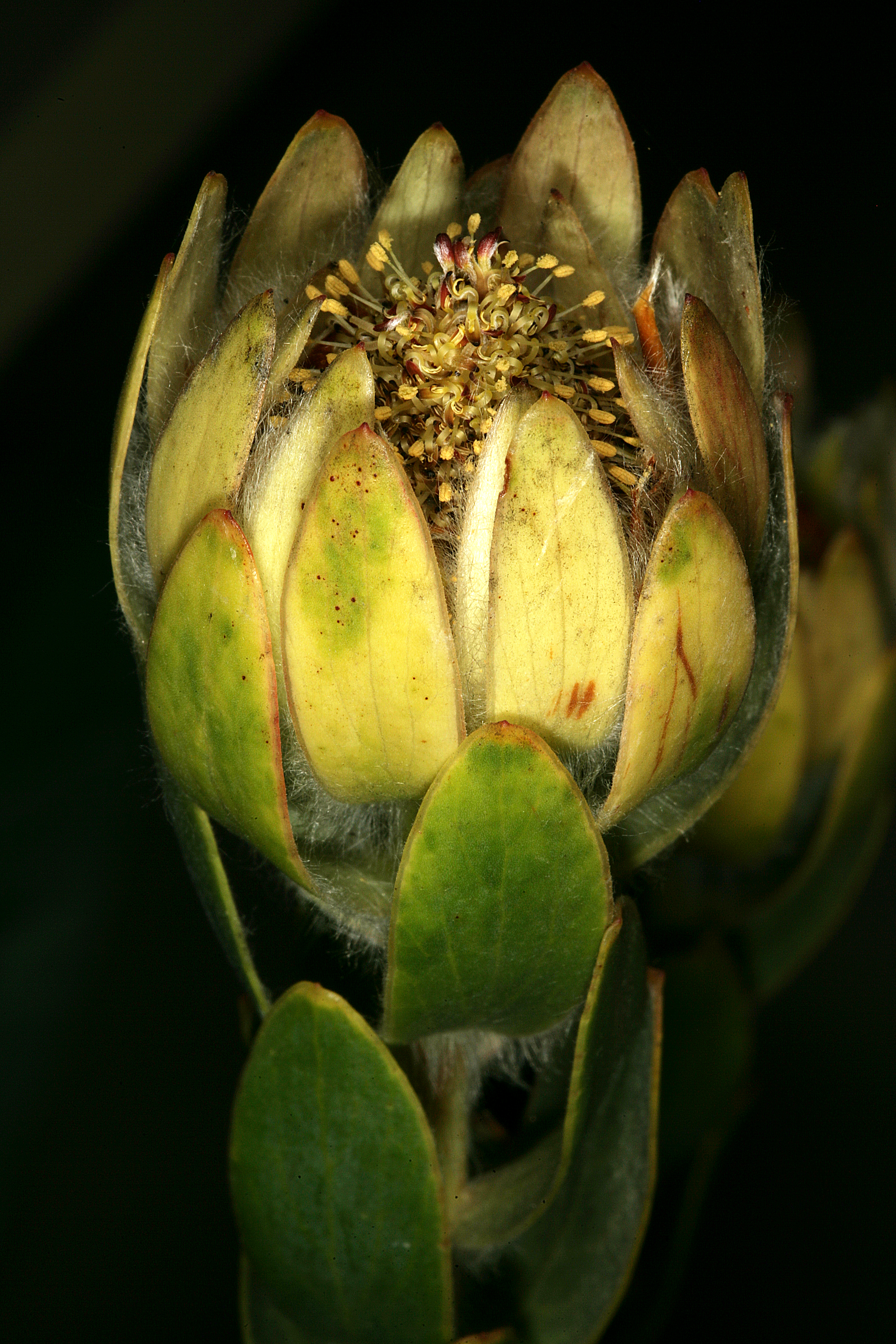

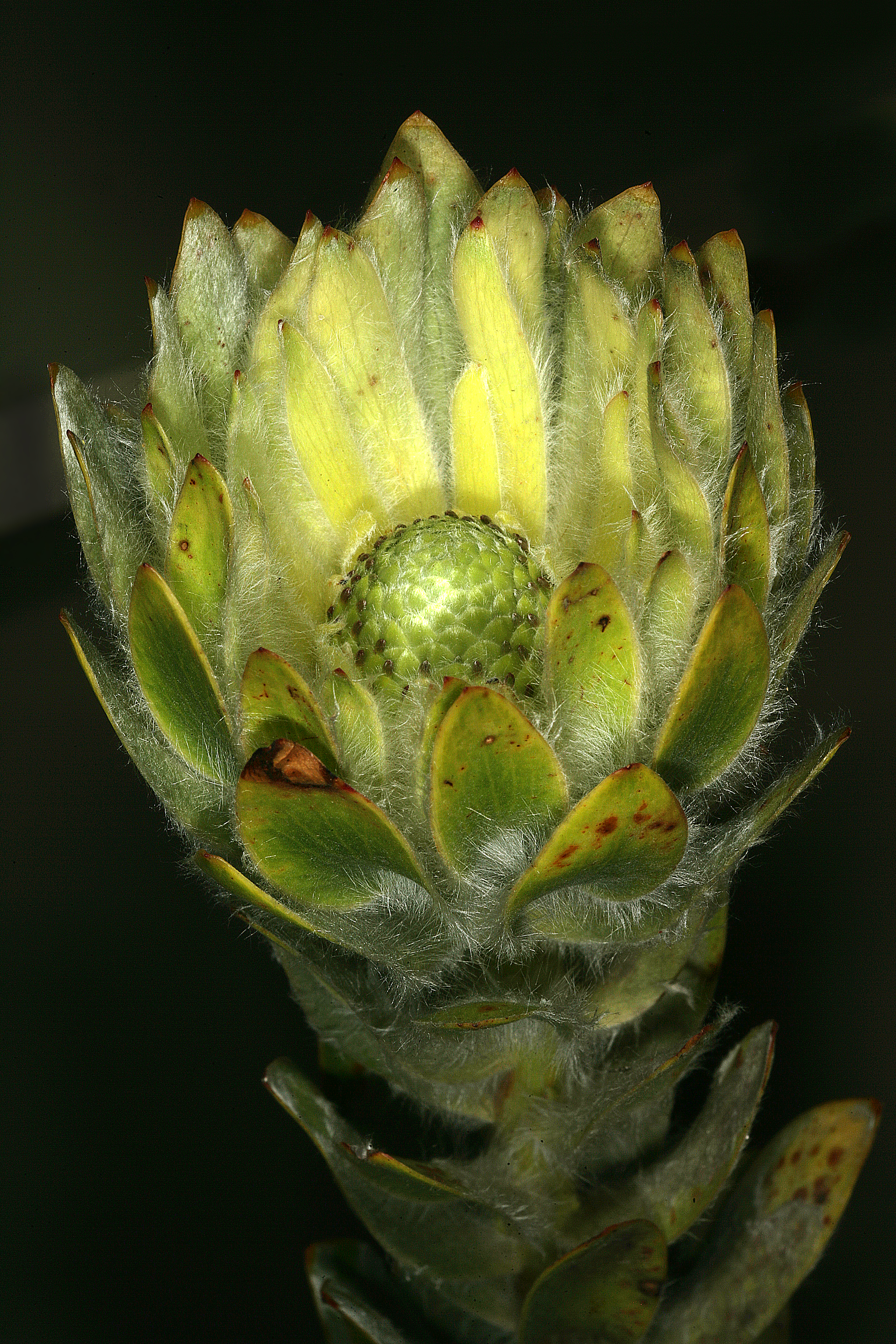

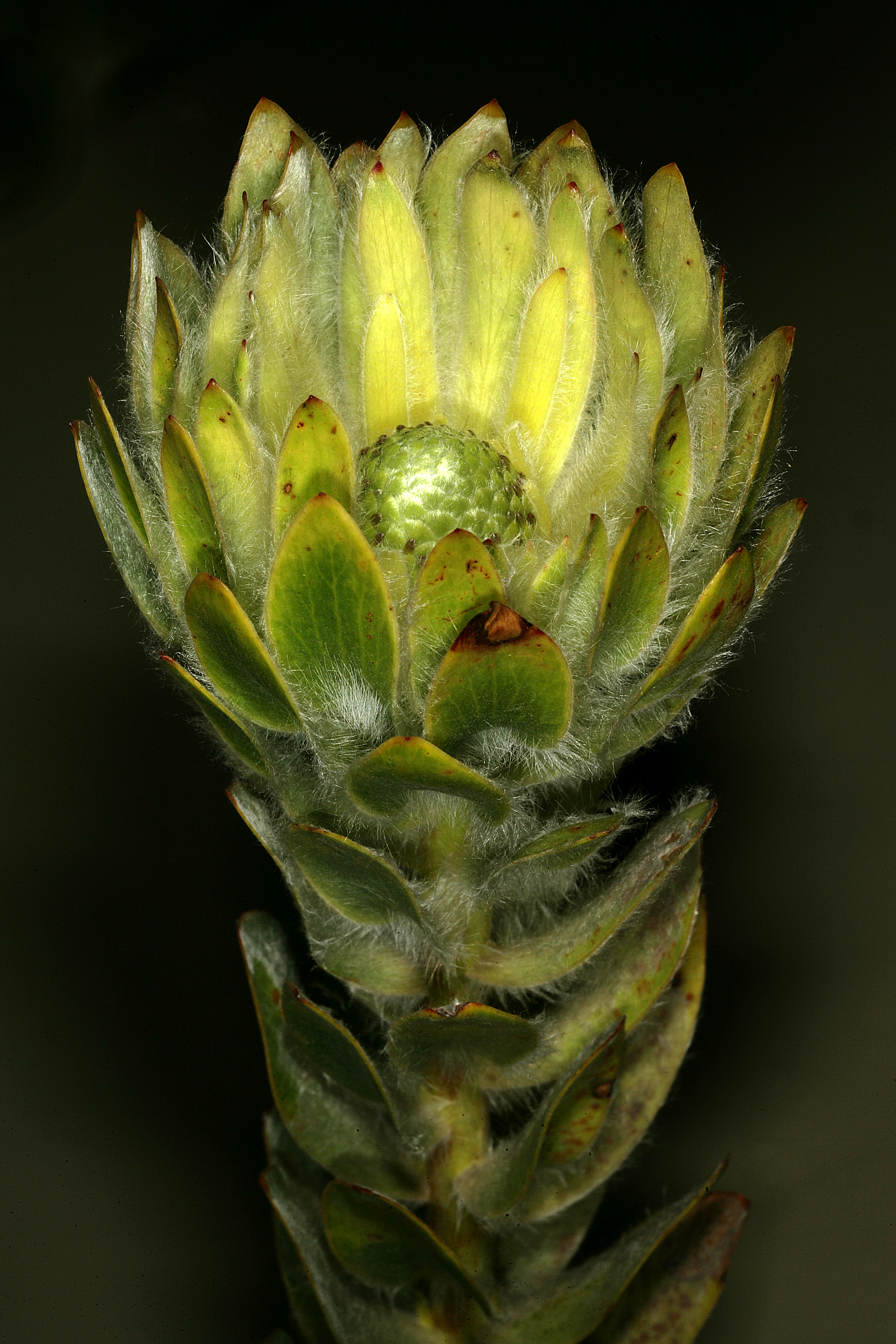
