= Serruria leipoldtii =

Conservation status
- Near Threatened (IUCN 3.1)

Scientific classification
- Kingdom: Plantae
- Clade: Tracheophytes
- Clade: Angiosperms
- Clade: Eudicots
- Order: Proteales
- Family: Proteaceae
- Genus: Serruria
- Species: S. leipoldtii

Binomial name
- Serruria leipoldtii E.Phillips & Hutch.

Species of plant

Serruria leipoldtii, the Leipoldt's spiderhead, is a flowering shrub that belongs to the family Proteaceae. It is part of the South African fynbos vegetation type. The plant is endemic to the Western Cape and occurs in the northern Sederberg. The shrub grows up to 1.5 m tall with a diameter of 30 cm and flowers from summer to autumn.

The plant sprouts again after a fire. Two months after flowering, the fruit falls and ants disperse the seeds. They store the seeds in their nests. The plant is unisexual. The plant grows in sandstone soil at elevations of 1000–1400 m.

The plant is named after the Afrikaans poet C. Louis Leipoldt.
