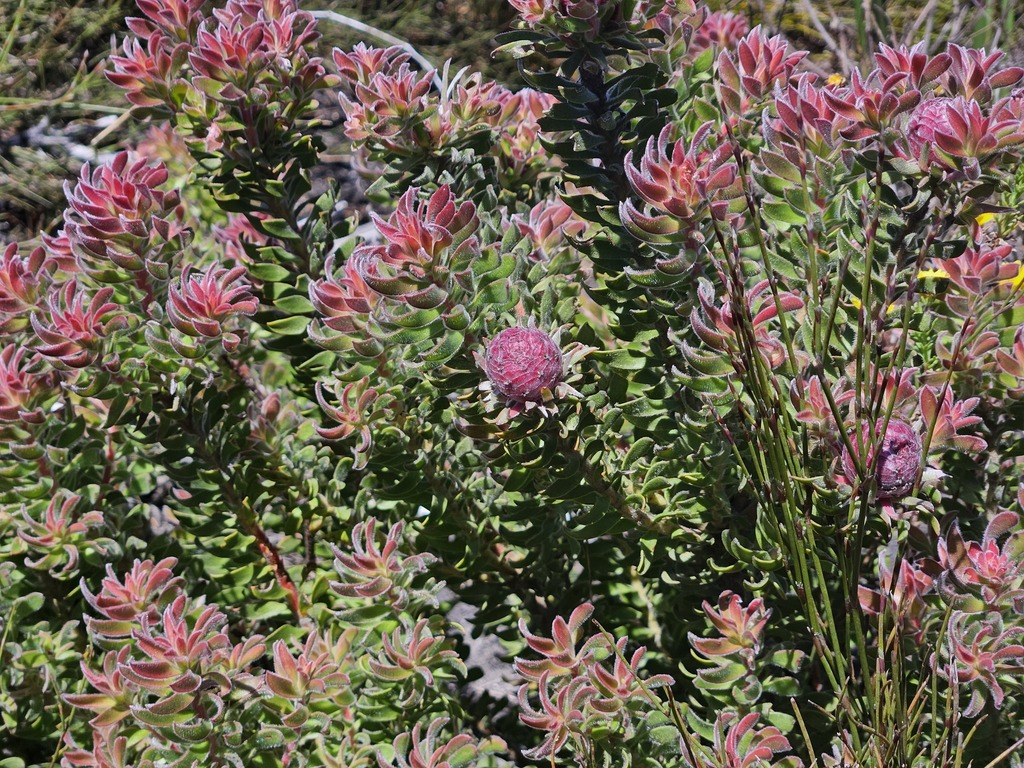

Conservation status
- Endangered (IUCN 3.1)

Scientific classification
- Kingdom: Plantae
- Clade: Tracheophytes
- Clade: Angiosperms
- Clade: Eudicots
- Order: Proteales
- Family: Proteaceae
- Genus: Leucadendron
- Species: L. radiatum

Binomial name
- Leucadendron radiatum E.Phillips & Hutch.

= Leucadendron radiatum =

Species of flowering plant

Leucadendron radiatum, also called the Langeberg conebush, is a flowering shrub that belongs to the family Proteaceae. It is part of the South African Fynbos vegetation type. The plant is endemic to the Western Cape where it occurs on the Langeberg from Grootberg to Kampscheberg.

The shrub grows to a height of 60 cm and flowers from October to December. The plant dies after a fire but the seeds survive. The seeds are stored in a whorl on the female plant and fall to the ground after a fire and may be dispersed by the wind. The plant is unisexual, and there are separate plants with male and female flowers, which are pollinated by the wind. The plant grows mainly on southern slopes at altitudes of 910 - 1,700 m.

== Sources ==
- REDLIST Sanbi
- Biodiversityexplorer
- Protea Atlas
- Plants of the World Online
