= Leucadendron meyerianum =

Conservation status
- Endangered (IUCN 3.1)

Scientific classification
- Kingdom: Plantae
- Clade: Tracheophytes
- Clade: Angiosperms
- Clade: Eudicots
- Order: Proteales
- Family: Proteaceae
- Genus: Leucadendron
- Species: L. meyerianum

Binomial name
- Leucadendron meyerianum H.Buek ex E.Phillips & Hutch.

Species of flowering plant

Leucadendron meyerianum, the Van Rhynsdorp conebush, is a flower-bearing shrub that belongs to the family Proteaceae. It is part of the fynbos vegetation type of South Africa. The plant is native to the Western Cape and Northern Cape, where it occurs in the Bokkeveld escarpment near Nieuwoudtville. The shrub grows 2.0 m tall and bears flowers in August. Two months after the plant has flowered, the fruit appears and the seeds later fall to the ground where they are spread by rodents. The plant grows in level, sandstone sand at altitudes of 800 m. Small beetles do the pollination.

In Afrikaans it known as Vanrhynsdorptolbos.
