= Hortipes luytenae =

Scientific classification
- Kingdom: Animalia
- Phylum: Arthropoda
- Subphylum: Chelicerata
- Class: Arachnida
- Order: Araneae
- Infraorder: Araneomorphae
- Family: Corinnidae
- Genus: Hortipes
- Species: H. luytenae

Binomial name
- Hortipes luytenae Bosselaers & Ledoux, 1998

Species of spider

Hortipes luytenae is a species of spider in the family Corinnidae. It is endemic to South Africa. It is the type species of the genus Hortipes.

== Distribution ==
Hortipes luytenae is endemic to KwaZulu-Natal province in South Africa. It is known only from the type locality at Ngome State Forest.

== Habitat and ecology ==
The species inhabits the Savanna biome at 1,044 m above sea level. It is strongly associated with leaf litter in forest habitats, specifically Southern Mistbelt Forest. The species appears to be quite common locally, with over 170 specimens collected from pitfall traps at the type locality.

== Description ==
Hortipes luytenae is known from both sexes.

== Conservation ==
Hortipes luytenae is listed as Data Deficient. More sampling is needed to determine the species' range beyond the type locality. The species is protected in a state forest and faces no known threats.
