= Hortipes merwei =

Van der Merwe's basket-legged spider

Conservation status
- Vulnerable (SANBI Red List)

Scientific classification
- Kingdom: Animalia
- Phylum: Arthropoda
- Subphylum: Chelicerata
- Class: Arachnida
- Order: Araneae
- Infraorder: Araneomorphae
- Family: Corinnidae
- Genus: Hortipes
- Species: H. merwei

Binomial name
- Hortipes merwei Bosselaers & Jocqué, 2000

Species of spider

Hortipes merwei is a species of spider in the family Corinnidae. It is endemic to South Africa and is commonly known as Van der Merwe's basket-legged spider.

== Distribution ==
Hortipes merwei is endemic to KwaZulu-Natal province in South Africa. It has been recorded from several localities including iSimangaliso Wetland Park, Ngome State Forest, Ophathe Game Reserve, and Dukuduku Forest Station.

== Habitat and ecology ==
The species inhabits Forest, Indian Ocean Coastal Belt and Savanna biomes at altitudes ranging from 4 to 1,061 m above sea level. It is strongly associated with leaf litter in woodland and forest habitats, particularly Southern Mistbelt Forest. The species has also been found in commercial pine plantations.

== Description ==
Hortipes merwei is known from both sexes.

== Conservation ==
Hortipes merwei is listed as Vulnerable by the South African National Biodiversity Institute due to its small distribution range. The species is relatively widespread in northern KwaZulu-Natal and is quite common in litter samples. It is protected in three protected areas but faces threats from habitat loss due to agricultural activities, silviculture, and degradation around Lake St. Lucia.
