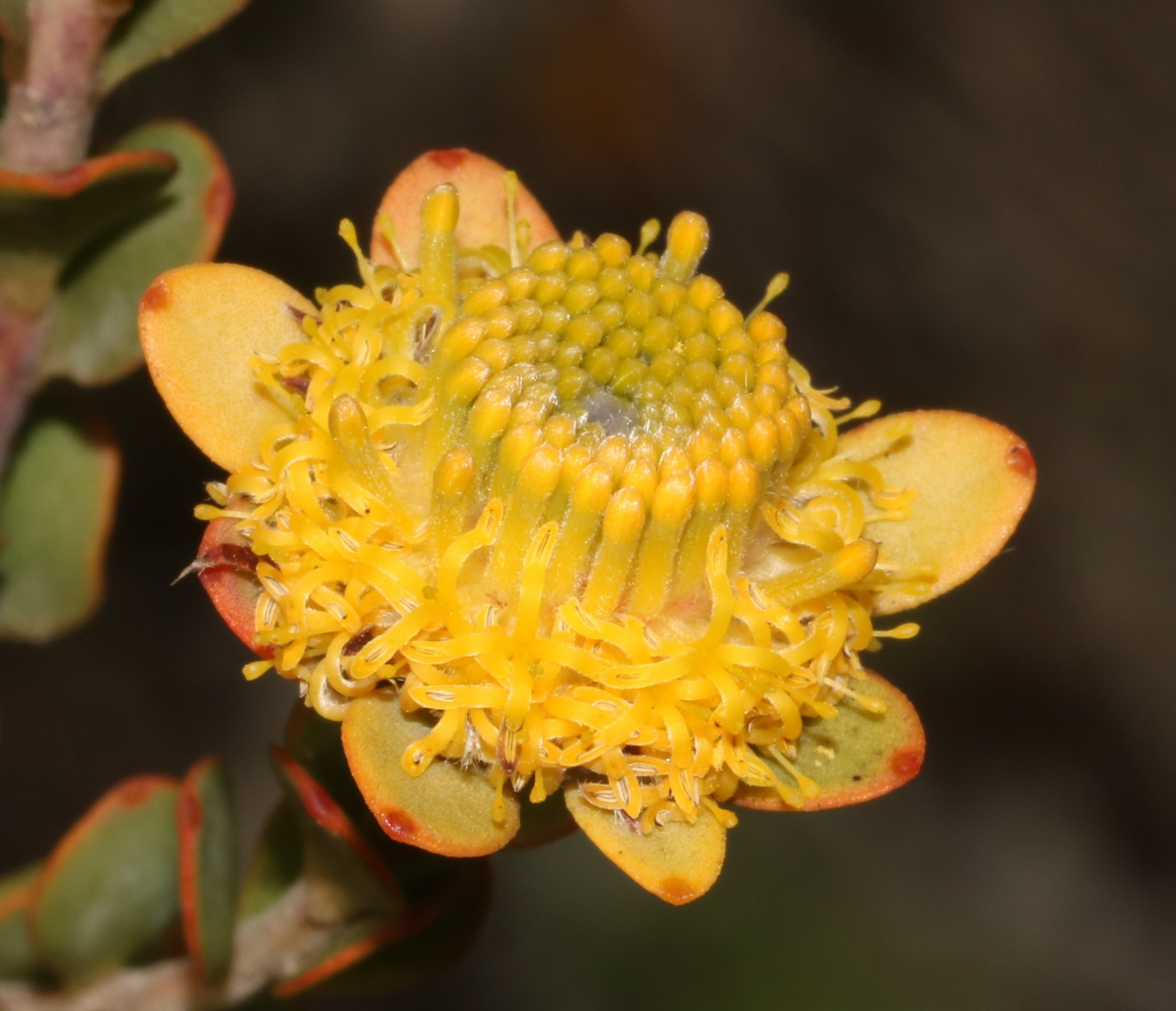

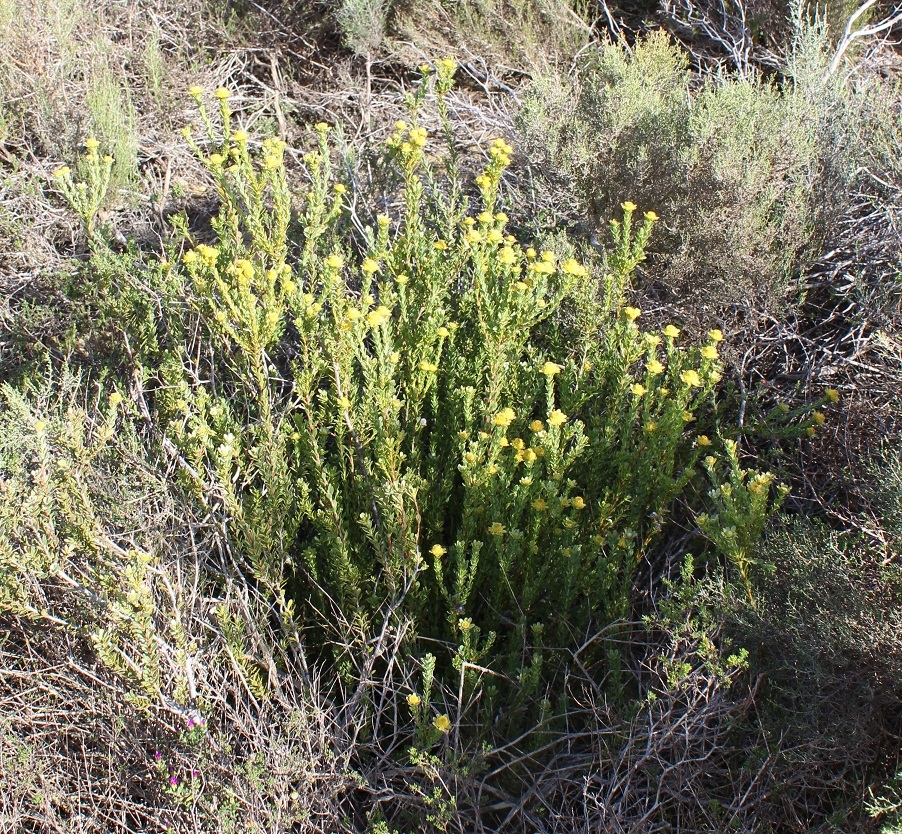

Conservation status
- Endangered (IUCN 3.1)

Scientific classification
- Kingdom: Plantae
- Clade: Tracheophytes
- Clade: Angiosperms
- Clade: Eudicots
- Order: Proteales
- Family: Proteaceae
- Genus: Leucadendron
- Species: L. coriaceum

Binomial name
- Leucadendron coriaceum E.Phillips & Hutch.

= Leucadendron coriaceum =

Species of flowering plant

Leucadendron coriaceum, the rosette conebush, is a flower-bearing shrub that belongs to the family Proteaceae. It is part of the fynbos vegetation type of South Africa. The plant is native to the Western Cape, South Africa.

== Description ==
In Afrikaans, it is known as Rosettolbos.

== Distribution and habitat ==
The plant occurs from Napier to Riversdale.

== Gallery ==
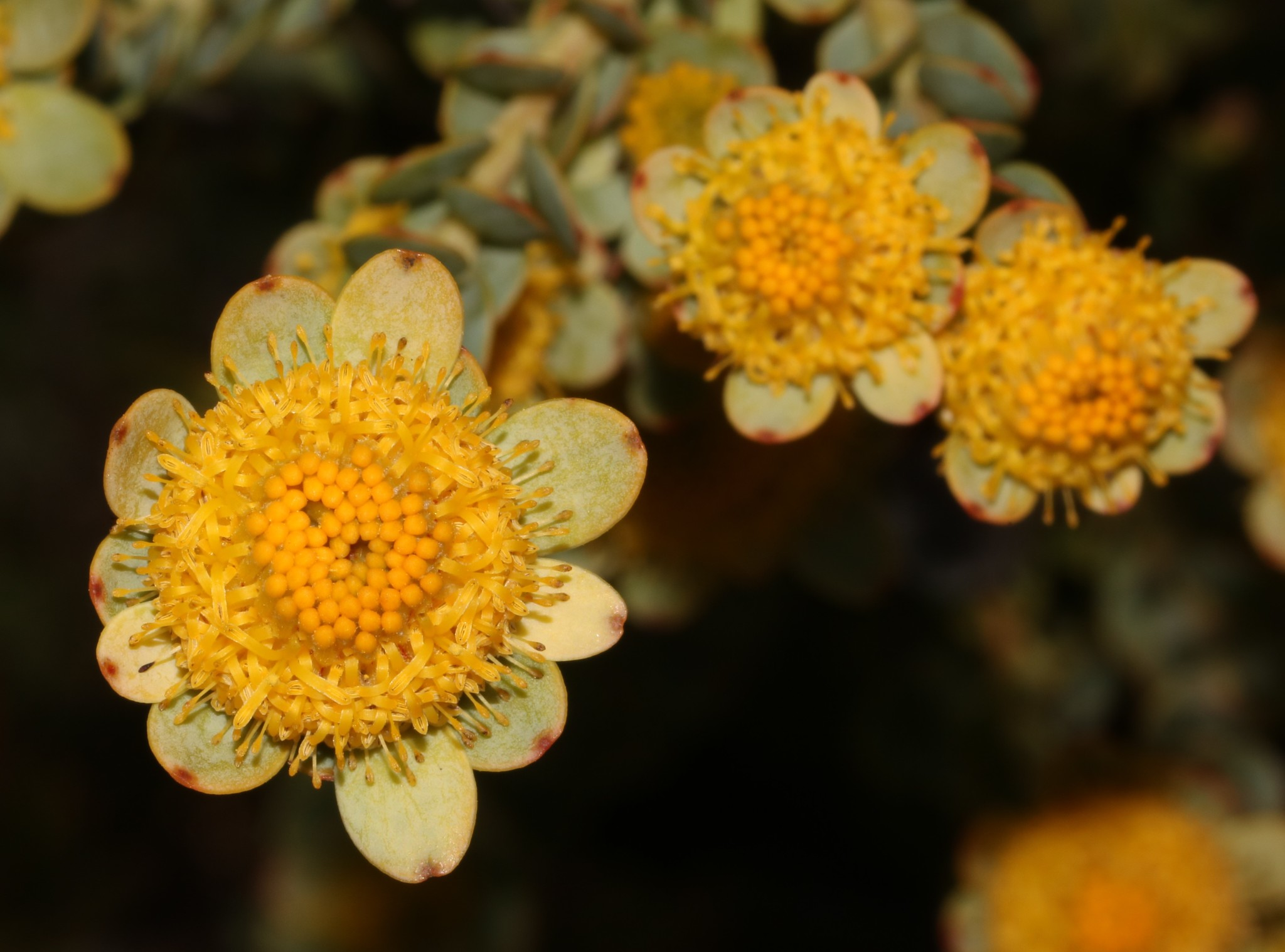

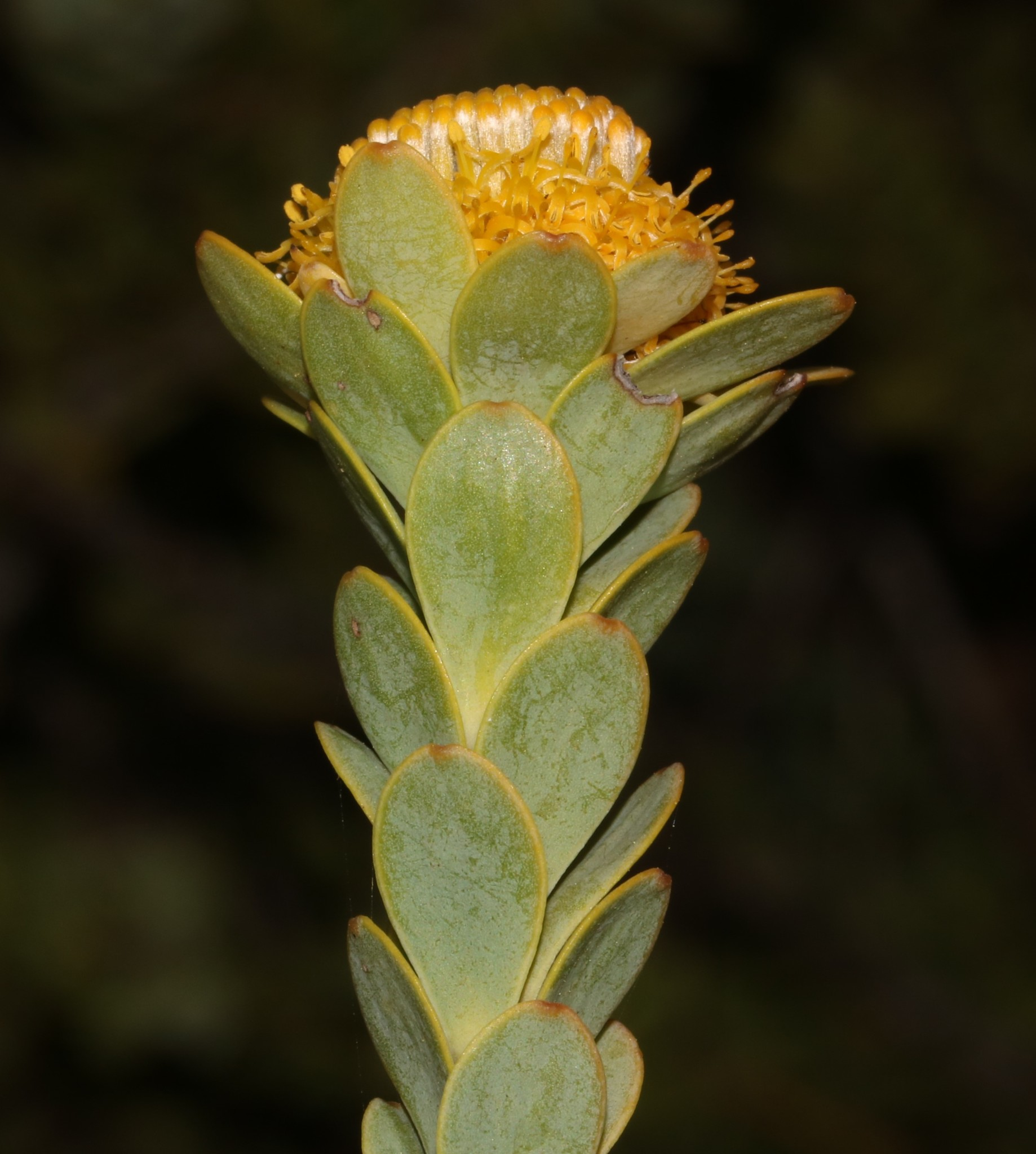

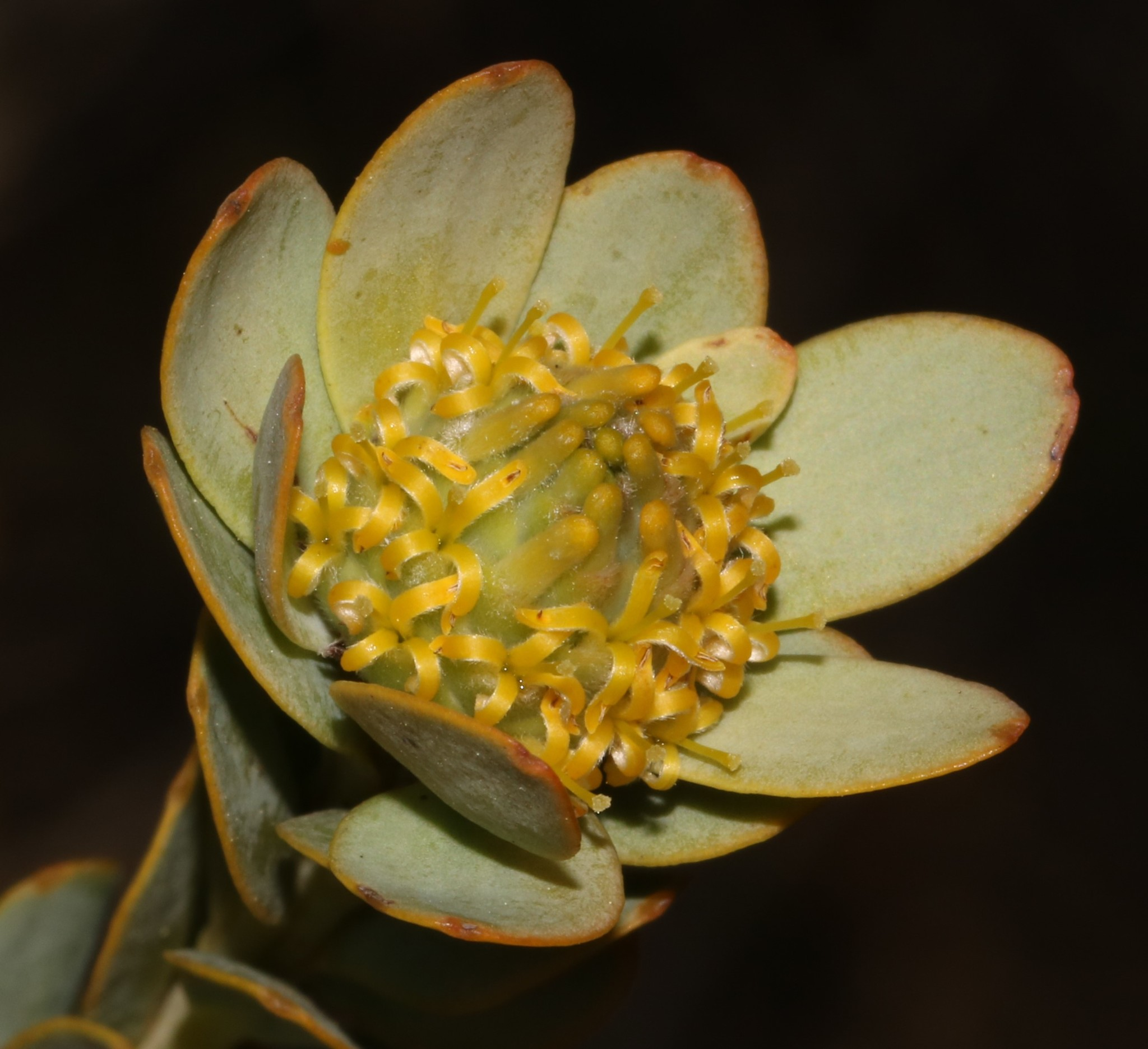
