= Hortipes aelurisiepae =

Ingwavuma basket-legged spider

Conservation status
- Least Concern (SANBI Red List)

Scientific classification
- Kingdom: Animalia
- Phylum: Arthropoda
- Subphylum: Chelicerata
- Class: Arachnida
- Order: Araneae
- Infraorder: Araneomorphae
- Family: Corinnidae
- Genus: Hortipes
- Species: H. aelurisiepae

Binomial name
- Hortipes aelurisiepae Bosselaers & Jocqué, 2000

Species of spider

Hortipes aelurisiepae is a species of spider in the family Corinnidae. It is endemic to southern Africa and is commonly known as the Ingwavuma basket-legged spider.

== Distribution ==
Hortipes aelurisiepae occurs in Mozambique and South Africa. In South Africa, it is known only from the KwaZulu-Natal province, where it has been recorded from Ingwavuma, iSimangaliso Wetland Park (including Sodwana Bay National Park), Ndumo Game Reserve, and Tembe Elephant Park.

== Habitat and ecology ==
The species inhabits Forest, Indian Ocean Coastal Belt and Savanna biomes at altitudes ranging from 30 to 646 m above sea level. These small free-running spiders are found in forest areas and humus, where they live among leaf litter.

== Description ==
Hortipes aelurisiepae is a small spider known only from females.

== Conservation ==
Hortipes aelurisiepae is listed as Least Concern by the South African National Biodiversity Institute due to its wide geographical range in southern Africa. The species is protected in three protected areas and faces no significant known threats.

== Taxonomy ==
The species was first described by Bosselaers and Jocqué in 2000. There is uncertainty about the taxonomic status of this species, as it was collected together with males of Hortipes griswoldi at Ndumo Game Reserve, suggesting the two species might be synonyms.
