= Hortipes hyakutake =

Scientific classification
- Kingdom: Animalia
- Phylum: Arthropoda
- Subphylum: Chelicerata
- Class: Arachnida
- Order: Araneae
- Infraorder: Araneomorphae
- Family: Corinnidae
- Genus: Hortipes
- Species: H. hyakutake

Binomial name
- Hortipes hyakutake Bosselaers & Jocqué, 2000

Species of spider

Hortipes hyakutake is a species of spider in the family Corinnidae. It is endemic to South Africa.

== Etymology ==
The species is named after Comet Hyakutake, which passed Earth in 1996.

== Distribution ==
Hortipes hyakutake is endemic to the Eastern Cape province in South Africa. It is known only from the type locality at Ingogo Forest Reserve near Msikaba.

== Habitat and ecology ==
The species inhabits the Indian Ocean Coastal Belt biome at an altitude of 244 m above sea level. It is strongly associated with leaf litter in woodland habitats.

== Description ==
Hortipes hyakutake is known only from males. Its general colouration is yellow, with no patterns on its abdomen. Its total length is 1.9 mm, with a carapace length of 0.9 mm and a width of 0.8 mm.

== Conservation ==
Hortipes hyakutake is listed as Data Deficient for taxonomic reasons. More sampling is needed to collect females and determine the species' range. The species is threatened by habitat loss for farming activities and infrastructure development.
