= Hortipes licnophorus =

Scientific classification
- Kingdom: Animalia
- Phylum: Arthropoda
- Subphylum: Chelicerata
- Class: Arachnida
- Order: Araneae
- Infraorder: Araneomorphae
- Family: Corinnidae
- Genus: Hortipes
- Species: H. licnophorus

Binomial name
- Hortipes licnophorus Bosselaers & Jocqué, 2000

Species of spider

Hortipes licnophorus is a species of spider in the family Corinnidae. It is endemic to South Africa.

== Distribution ==
Hortipes licnophorus is endemic to Mpumalanga province in South Africa. It is known only from the type locality at Mariepskop.

== Habitat and ecology ==
The species inhabits the Savanna biome at 1,431 m above sea level. It is strongly associated with leaf litter in forest habitats, specifically in Northern Escarpment Quartzite Sourveld.

== Description ==
Hortipes licnophorus is known only from females.

== Conservation ==
Hortipes licnophorus is listed as Data Deficient for taxonomic reasons. More sampling is needed to collect males and determine the species' range. There are no known threats to the species.
