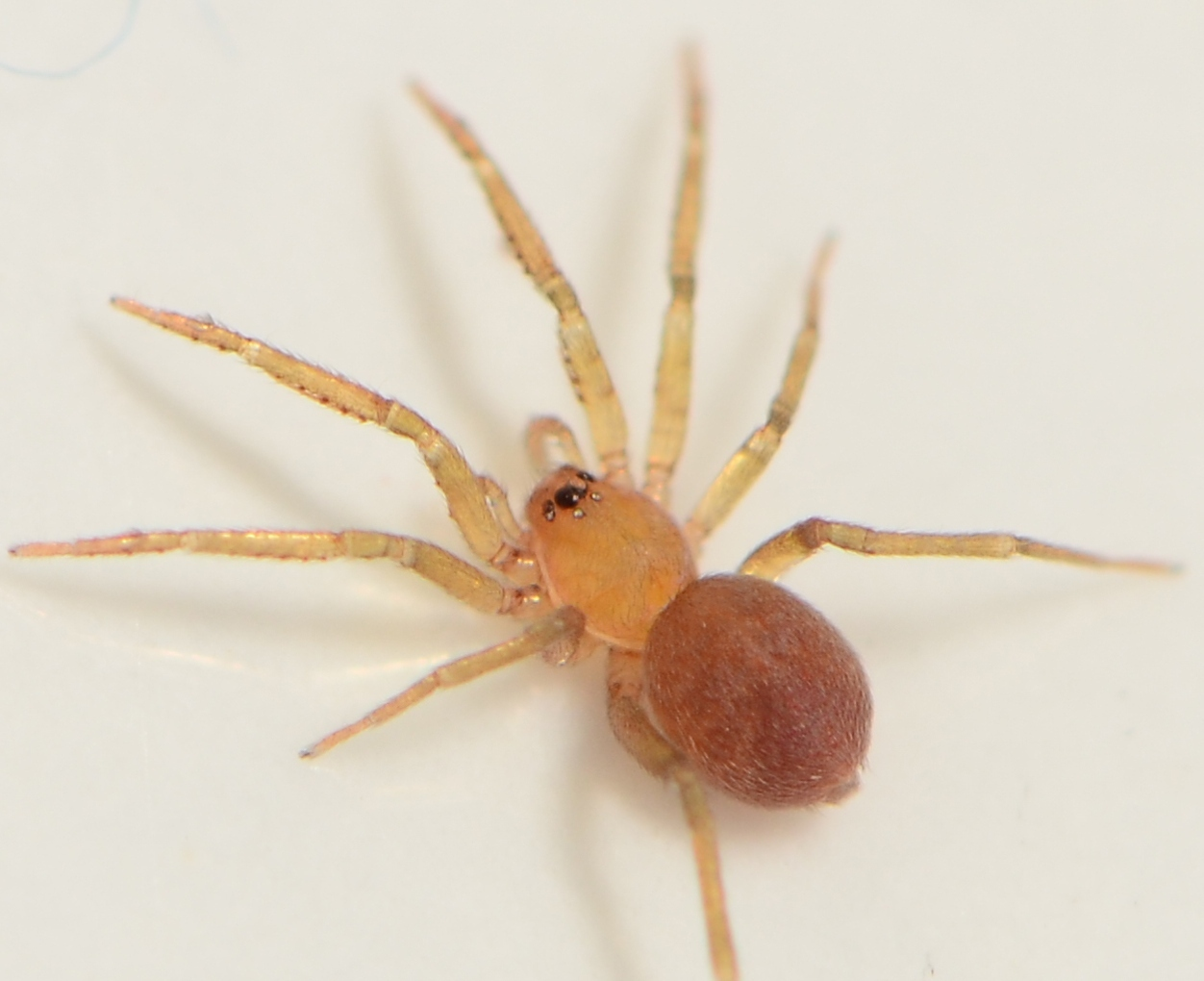
- Female
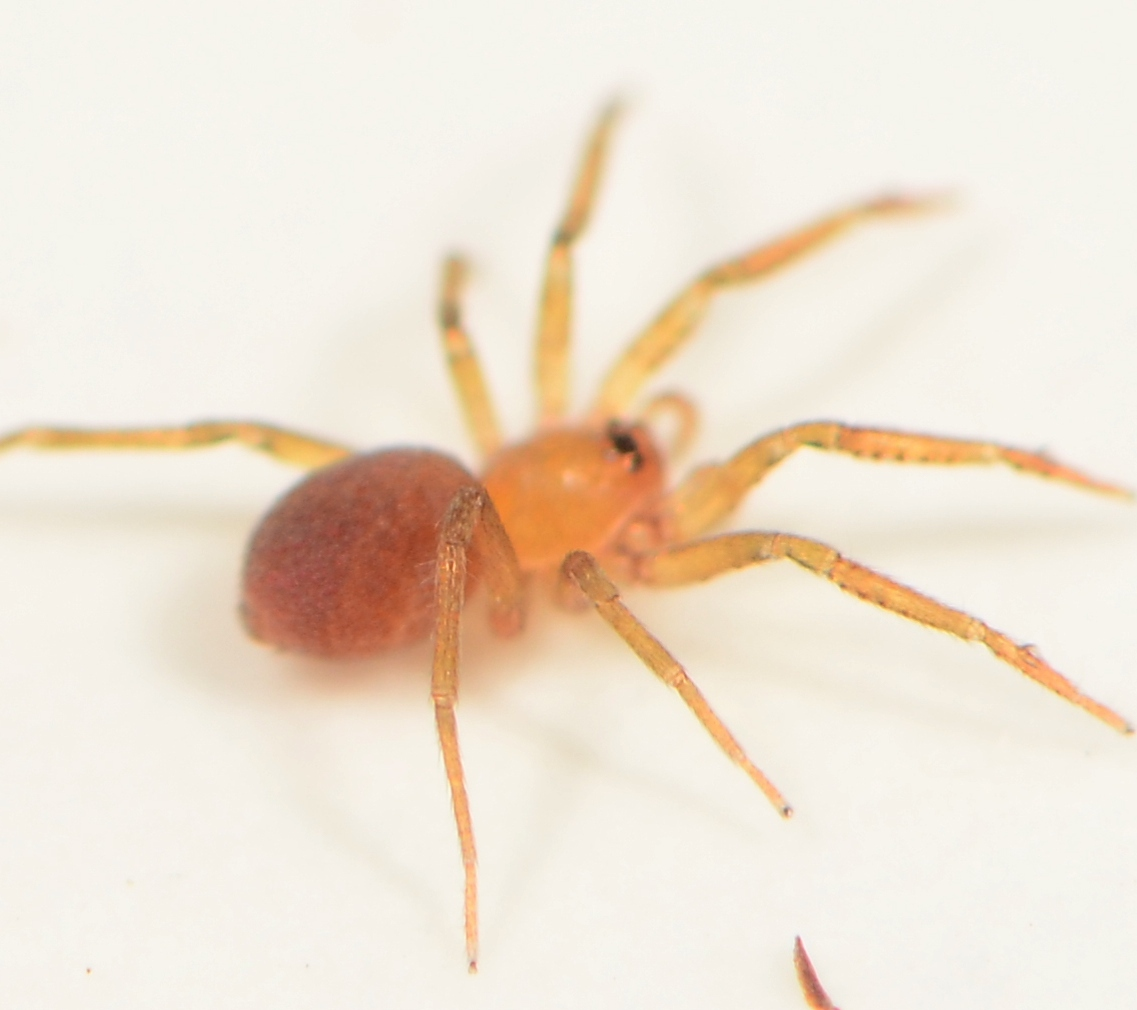
- Female

Scientific classification
- Kingdom: Animalia
- Phylum: Arthropoda
- Subphylum: Chelicerata
- Class: Arachnida
- Order: Araneae
- Infraorder: Araneomorphae
- Family: Corinnidae
- Genus: Hortipes
- Species: H. coccinatus

Binomial name
- Hortipes coccinatus Bosselaers & Jocqué, 2000

= Hortipes coccinatus =

Limpopo basket-legged spider

Species of spider

Hortipes coccinatus is a species of spider in the family Corinnidae. It is endemic to South Africa and is commonly known as the Limpopo basket-legged spider.

== Distribution ==
Hortipes coccinatus is endemic to Limpopo province in South Africa. It has been recorded from several localities including Lekgalameetse Nature Reserve, Woodbush Forest Reserve, Mariepskop, and areas around Haenertsburg and Polokwane.

== Habitat and ecology ==
The species inhabits Forest and Savanna biomes at altitudes ranging from 920 to 1,500 m above sea level.

It is strongly associated with leaf litter in woodland habitats.

== Conservation ==
Hortipes coccinatus is listed as Vulnerable by the South African National Biodiversity Institute due to its small restricted distribution range. The species is protected in two reserves and several forests around Tzaneen, though it faces threats from agricultural activities around Haenertsburg.
