= Hortipes griswoldi =

Scientific classification
- Kingdom: Animalia
- Phylum: Arthropoda
- Subphylum: Chelicerata
- Class: Arachnida
- Order: Araneae
- Infraorder: Araneomorphae
- Family: Corinnidae
- Genus: Hortipes
- Species: H. griswoldi

Binomial name
- Hortipes griswoldi Bosselaers & Jocqué, 2000

Species of spider

Hortipes griswoldi is a species of spider in the family Corinnidae. It is endemic to South Africa and is commonly known as Griswold's basket-legged spider.

== Etymology ==
The species is named after arachnologist species:Charles E. Griswold.

== Distribution ==
Hortipes griswoldi is known from two provinces in South Africa: KwaZulu-Natal (Ndumo Game Reserve) and Mpumalanga (Sabie, Ceylon Forest).

== Habitat and ecology ==
The species inhabits Forest and Savanna biomes at altitudes ranging from 30 to 1,050 m above sea level. These free-running ground-dwellers are found in leaf litter in indigenous forests and floodplains.

== Description ==
Hortipes griswoldi is known only from females.

== Conservation ==
Hortipes griswoldi is listed as Data Deficient for taxonomic reasons. More sampling is needed to determine the species' range and evaluate whether it represents the undescribed male of Hortipes aelurisiepae. The species is protected in Ndumo Game Reserve and faces no known threats.
