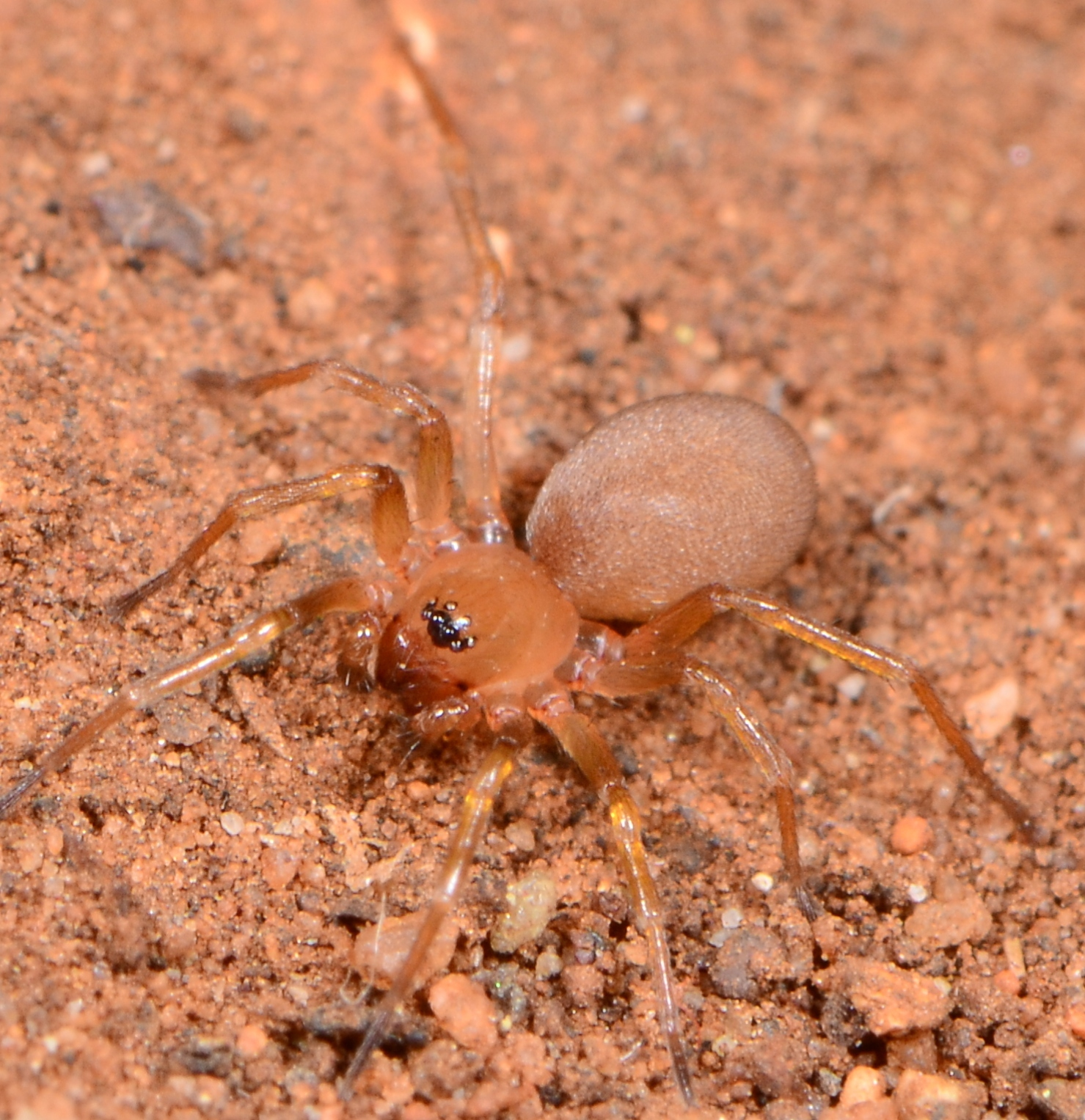
- Female
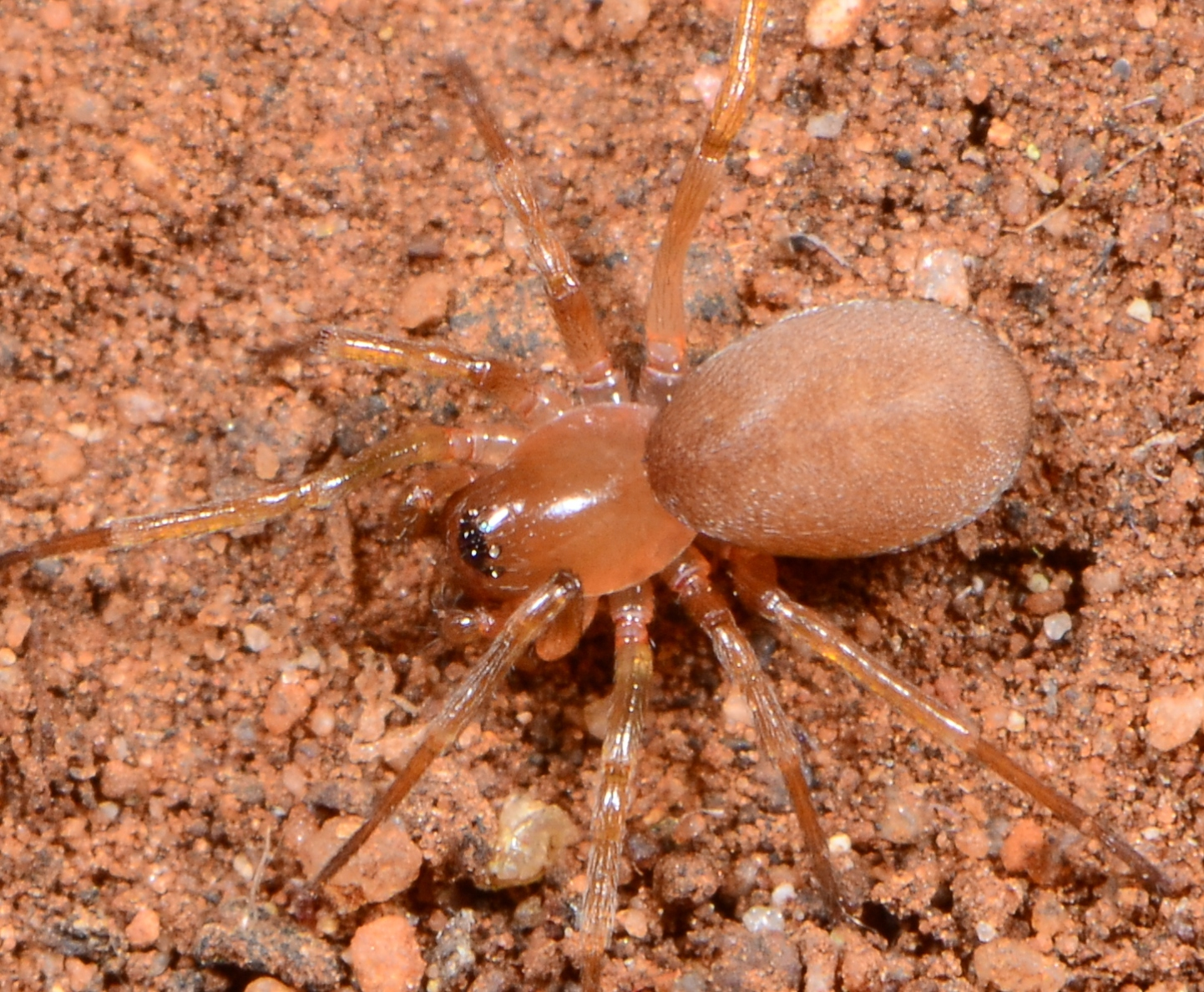
- Female

Scientific classification
- Kingdom: Animalia
- Phylum: Arthropoda
- Subphylum: Chelicerata
- Class: Arachnida
- Order: Araneae
- Infraorder: Araneomorphae
- Family: Corinnidae
- Genus: Hortipes
- Species: H. schoemanae

Binomial name
- Hortipes schoemanae Bosselaers & Jocqué, 2000

= Hortipes schoemanae =

Schoeman's basket-legged spider

Species of spider

Hortipes schoemanae is a species of spider in the family Corinnidae. It occurs in southern Africa and is commonly known as Schoeman's basket-legged spider.

== Distribution ==
Hortipes schoemanae occurs in Eswatini and South Africa. In South Africa, it is known from three provinces: Gauteng (Pretoria National Botanical Garden), KwaZulu-Natal (Ithala Game Reserve), and Mpumalanga (multiple localities around Barberton and Sabie).

== Habitat and ecology ==
The species inhabits Forest, Grassland and Savanna biomes at altitudes ranging from 807 to 1,303 m above sea level.

It is a ground-dweller found in leaf litter and collected using pitfall traps in indigenous forest and woodlands. The species has also been found in commercial pine plantations.

== Conservation ==
Hortipes schoemanae is listed as Least Concern by the South African National Biodiversity Institute due to its wide geographical range. The species is protected in three protected areas and faces no known threats.
