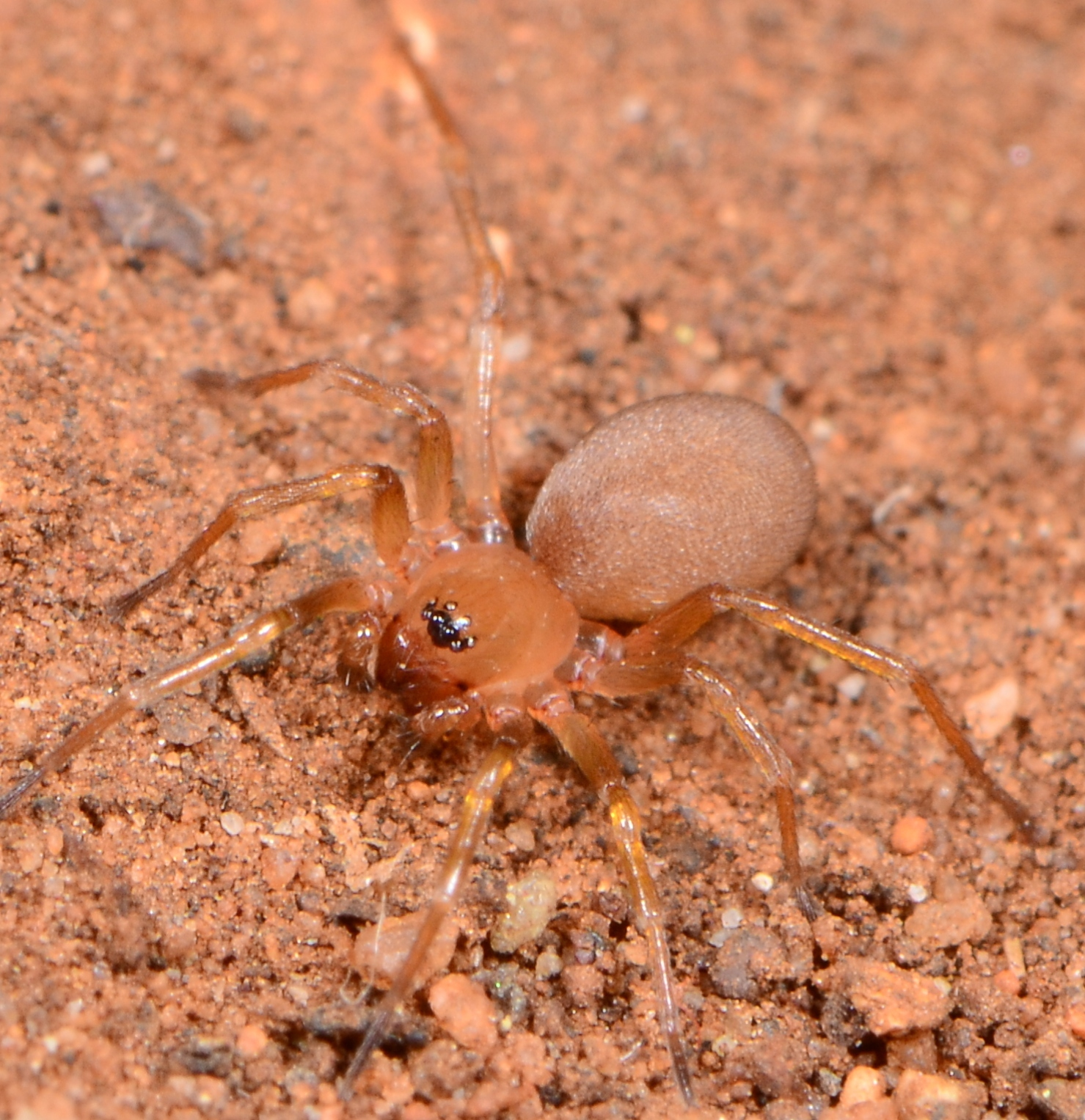
- Female H. schoemanae
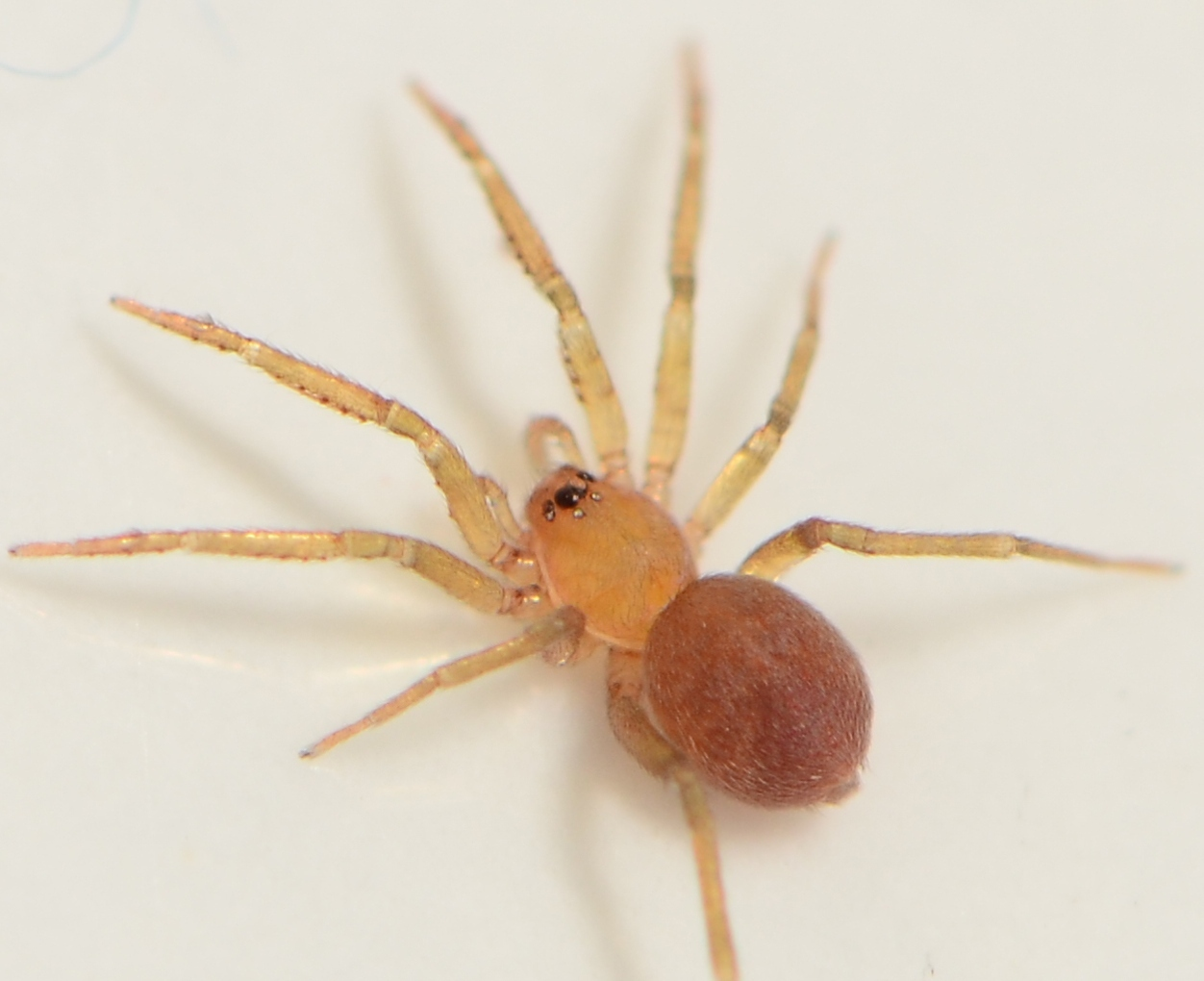
- Female H. coccinatus

Scientific classification
- Kingdom: Animalia
- Phylum: Arthropoda
- Subphylum: Chelicerata
- Class: Arachnida
- Order: Araneae
- Infraorder: Araneomorphae
- Family: Corinnidae
- Genus: Hortipes; Bosselaers & Ledoux, 1998

Type species
- H. luytenae Bosselaers & Ledoux, 1998

Species
- 70, see text

= Hortipes =

Genus of spiders

Hortipes is a genus of African corinnid sac spiders first described by J. Bosselaers & J.-C. Ledoux in 1998.

== Description ==
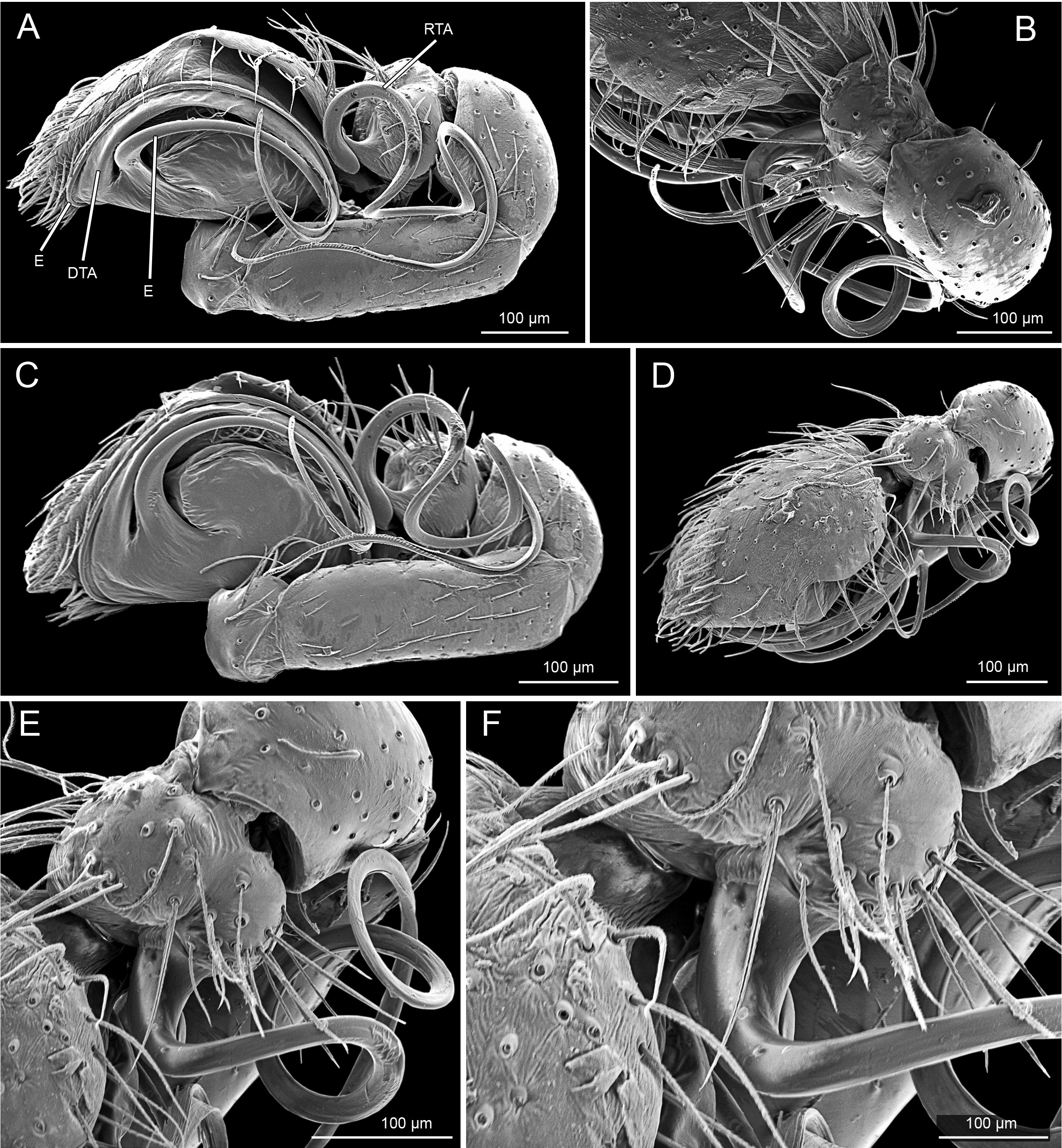
Anatomical photos of H. gigapophysalis

== Species ==
As of October 2025, this genus includes seventy species:

- Hortipes abucoletus Bosselaers & Jocqué, 2000 – Cameroon
- Hortipes aelurisiepae Bosselaers & Jocqué, 2000 – Mozabique, South Africa
- Hortipes alderweireldti Bosselaers & Jocqué, 2000 – Equatorial Guinea
- Hortipes amphibolus Bosselaers & Jocqué, 2000 – DR Congo
- Hortipes anansiodatus Bosselaers & Jocqué, 2000 – Cameroon
- Hortipes angariopsis Bosselaers & Jocqué, 2000 – Tanzania
- Hortipes arboricola Ledoux & Emerit, 1998 – Gabon
- Hortipes architelones Bosselaers & Jocqué, 2000 – Cameroon
- Hortipes atalante Bosselaers & Jocqué, 2000 – South Africa
- Hortipes auriga Bosselaers & Jocqué, 2000 – Congo
- Hortipes aurora Bosselaers & Jocqué, 2000 – Congo
- Hortipes baerti Bosselaers & Jocqué, 2000 – Ivory Coast
- Hortipes bjorni Bosselaers & Jocqué, 2000 – Tanzania
- Hortipes bosmansi Bosselaers & Jocqué, 2000 – Cameroon
- Hortipes calliblepharus Bosselaers & Jocqué, 2000 – Cameroon
- Hortipes castor Bosselaers & Jocqué, 2000 – Tanzania
- Hortipes centralis Bosselaers & Jocqué, 2000 – Congo
- Hortipes chrysothemis Bosselaers & Jocqué, 2000 – Cameroon
- Hortipes coccinatus Bosselaers & Jocqué, 2000 – South Africa
- Hortipes contubernalis Bosselaers & Jocqué, 2000 – South Africa
- Hortipes creber Bosselaers & Jocqué, 2000 – Tanzania
- Hortipes cucurbita Bosselaers & Jocqué, 2000 – Tanzania
- Hortipes delphinus Bosselaers & Jocqué, 2000 – Tanzania
- Hortipes depravator Bosselaers & Jocqué, 2000 – Cameroon
- Hortipes echo Bosselaers & Jocqué, 2000 – Congo
- Hortipes exoptans Bosselaers & Jocqué, 2000 – Tanzania
- Hortipes falcatus Bosselaers & Jocqué, 2000 – Congo, Rwanda, Uganda
- Hortipes fastigiensis Bosselaers & Jocqué, 2000 – Tanzania
- Hortipes fortipes Bosselaers & Jocqué, 2000 – Equatorial Guinea
- Hortipes gigapophysalis Jocqué, Bosselaers & Henrard, 2012 – Guinea
- Hortipes griswoldi Bosselaers & Jocqué, 2000 – South Africa
- Hortipes hastatus Bosselaers & Jocqué, 2000 – Congo, Uganda
- Hortipes hesperoecius Bosselaers & Jocqué, 2000 – Sierra Leone
- Hortipes hormigricola Bosselaers & Jocqué, 2000 – Cameroon
- Hortipes horta Bosselaers & Jocqué, 2000 – Congo
- Hortipes hyakutake Bosselaers & Jocqué, 2000 – South Africa
- Hortipes irimus Bosselaers & Jocqué, 2000 – South Africa
- Hortipes klumpkeae Bosselaers & Jocqué, 2000 – Tanzania
- Hortipes lejeunei Bosselaers & Jocqué, 2000 – Congo, Rwanda
- Hortipes leno Bosselaers & Jocqué, 2000 – Tanzania
- Hortipes libidinosus Bosselaers & Jocqué, 2000 – Tanzania
- Hortipes licnophorus Bosselaers & Jocqué, 2000 – South Africa
- Hortipes limicola Ledoux & Emerit, 1998 – Gabon
- Hortipes luytenae Bosselaers & Ledoux, 1998 – South Africa (type species)
- Hortipes machaeropolion Bosselaers & Jocqué, 2000 – Nigeria
- Hortipes marginatus Ledoux & Emerit, 1998 – Ivory Coast
- Hortipes merwei Bosselaers & Jocqué, 2000 – South Africa
- Hortipes mesembrinus Bosselaers & Jocqué, 2000 – South Africa
- Hortipes mulciber Bosselaers & Jocqué, 2000 – Tanzania
- Hortipes narcissus Bosselaers & Jocqué, 2000 – Congo
- Hortipes orchatocnemis Bosselaers & Jocqué, 2000 – Malawi
- Hortipes oronesiotes Bosselaers & Jocqué, 2000 – Malawi
- Hortipes ostiovolutus Bosselaers & Jocqué, 2000 – Tanzania
- Hortipes paludigena Ledoux & Emerit, 1998 – Gabon
- Hortipes penthesileia Bosselaers & Jocqué, 2000 – Malawi
- Hortipes platnicki Bosselaers & Jocqué, 2000 – Tanzania
- Hortipes pollux Bosselaers & Jocqué, 2000 – Malawi
- Hortipes puylaerti Bosselaers & Jocqué, 2000 – Cameroon
- Hortipes robertus Bosselaers & Jocqué, 2000 – Cameroon
- Hortipes rothorum Bosselaers & Jocqué, 2000 – South Africa
- Hortipes salticola Bosselaers & Jocqué, 2000 – Tanzania
- Hortipes sceptrum Bosselaers & Jocqué, 2000 – Cameroon
- Hortipes scharffi Bosselaers & Jocqué, 2000 – Tanzania
- Hortipes schoemanae Bosselaers & Jocqué, 2000 – South Africa, Eswatini
- Hortipes silvarum Ledoux & Emerit, 1998 – Ivory Coast
- Hortipes stoltzei Bosselaers & Jocqué, 2000 – Tanzania
- Hortipes tarachodes Bosselaers & Jocqué, 2000 – Congo
- Hortipes terminator Bosselaers & Jocqué, 2000 – Congo
- Hortipes wimmertensi Bosselaers & Jocqué, 2000 – South Africa
- Hortipes zombaensis Bosselaers & Jocqué, 2000 – Malawi
