= Tsakane Clay Grassland =

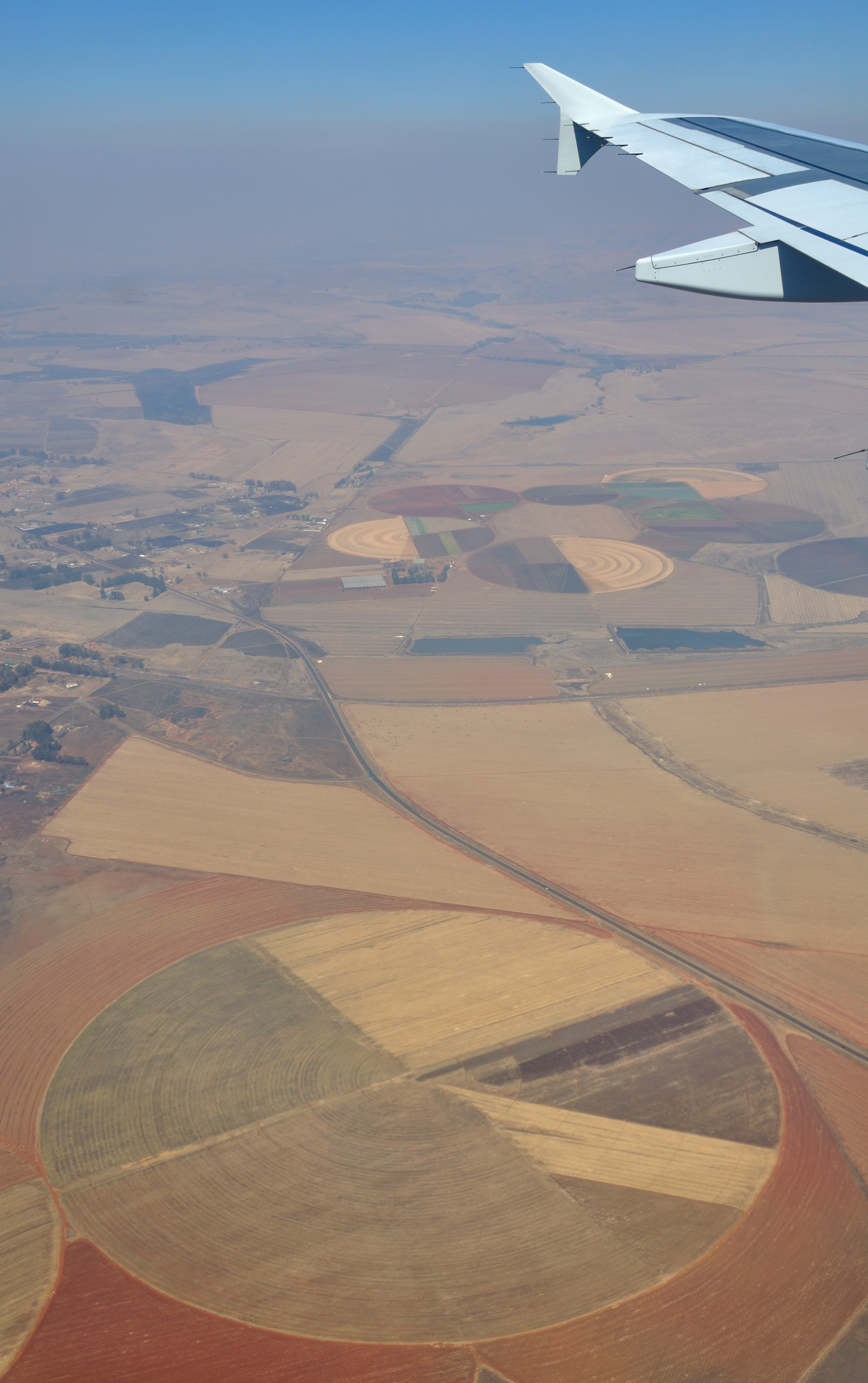
Tsakane viewed from above

The Tsakane Clay Grassland is a rare South African vegetation type supporting a unique grassland ecosystem. It is named after the township of Tsakane in Ekurhuleni, Gauteng, in which it is the dominant natural vegetation type. This ecosystem is characterized by its clay-rich soil, which supports a diverse array of flora and fauna, including several endemic and threatened species. The Tsakane Clay Grassland is an important conservation area, as it plays a crucial role in maintaining biodiversity and providing ecosystem services to the surrounding human populations.

== Geography ==
The Tsakane Clay Grassland is the main vegetation type within the Suikerbosrand Nature Reserve, with a smaller occurrence of the Andesite Mountain Bushveld (SVcb11) vegetation unit. The altitude varies between 1,545 and 1,917 meters above sea level. The grassland extends from Soweto to the town of Springs in Gauteng and is distributed in patches southwards to Nigel and Vereeniging. The vegetation unit also occurs in parts of Mpumalanga between Balfour and Standerton and also in the northern side of the Vaal Dam. The landscape is flat to slightly undulating, with low hills also present in some areas of the grassland.

== Biodiversity ==
The Tsakane Clay Grassland is home to a diverse range of plant species, including important taxa such as Andropogon schirensis, Eragrostis racemosa, Senecio inornatus, and Anthospermum rigidum subsp. pumilum. These species are adapted to the clay-rich soil conditions found in the grassland. The ecosystem also supports a variety of animal species, including mammals, birds, reptiles, and insects, many of which rely on the unique plant species for food and habitat.

== Conservation ==
The Tsakane Clay Grassland is an important conservation area due to its high levels of biodiversity and the presence of several threatened and endemic species. Efforts to conserve the ecosystem include the establishment of protected areas, as well as ongoing research and monitoring programs to better understand and manage the unique flora and fauna. These conservation efforts aim to preserve the ecological integrity of the grassland and ensure the long-term survival of its species.

== Threats ==
The Tsakane Clay Grassland faces several threats, primarily from human activities such as urbanization, agriculture, and mining. The expansion of nearby towns and cities has led to habitat loss and fragmentation, which can negatively impact the ecosystem's biodiversity. Additionally, the introduction of non-native species and pollution from various sources can further degrade the grassland and threaten its native species.

== See also ==
- Biodiversity of South Africa
