= Hortipes wimmertensi =

Wimmertens' basket-legged spider

Conservation status
- Critically endangered (SANBI Red List)

Scientific classification
- Kingdom: Animalia
- Phylum: Arthropoda
- Subphylum: Chelicerata
- Class: Arachnida
- Order: Araneae
- Infraorder: Araneomorphae
- Family: Corinnidae
- Genus: Hortipes
- Species: H. wimmertensi

Binomial name
- Hortipes wimmertensi Bosselaers & Jocqué, 2000

Species of spider

Hortipes wimmertensi is a species of spider in the family Corinnidae. It is endemic to South Africa and is commonly known as Wimmertens' basket-legged spider.

== Distribution ==
Hortipes wimmertensi is endemic to KwaZulu-Natal province in South Africa. It has been recorded from Oribi Gorge Nature Reserve and Port Shepstone.

== Habitat and ecology ==
The species inhabits the Savanna biome at altitudes ranging from 66 to 410 m above sea level. It is strongly associated with leaf litter in woodland and forest habitats, occurring in Eastern Valley Bushveld and the KwaZulu-Natal Coastal Belt.

== Description ==
Hortipes wimmertensi is known from both sexes.

== Conservation ==
Hortipes wimmertensi is listed as Critically Rare by the South African National Biodiversity Institute due to its small restricted distribution range. The species was last collected in 1961 and faces ongoing habitat decline due to infrastructure development, particularly urbanization in Port Shepstone.
