= Hortipes mesembrinus =

Scientific classification
- Kingdom: Animalia
- Phylum: Arthropoda
- Subphylum: Chelicerata
- Class: Arachnida
- Order: Araneae
- Infraorder: Araneomorphae
- Family: Corinnidae
- Genus: Hortipes
- Species: H. mesembrinus

Binomial name
- Hortipes mesembrinus Bosselaers & Jocqué, 2000

Species of spider

Hortipes mesembrinus is a species of spider in the family Corinnidae. It is endemic to South Africa.

== Distribution ==
Hortipes mesembrinus is endemic to the Eastern Cape province in South Africa. It has been recorded from several localities including East London, Coffee Bay, Cwebe Nature Reserve, Kei Mouth, Mazeppa Bay, and Mount Coke State Forest.

== Habitat and ecology ==
The species inhabits Forest, Indian Ocean Coastal Belt and Savanna biomes at altitudes ranging from 1 to 789 m above sea level. It is found in leaf litter in woodlands and coastal forests across various vegetation types including Ngongoni Veld, Bhisho Thornveld, Transkei Coastal Belt, and Albany Coastal Belt.

== Description ==
Hortipes mesembrinus is known from both sexes, though the male has been collected but not yet formally described.

== Conservation ==
Hortipes mesembrinus is listed as Data Deficient for taxonomic reasons. Further collecting is necessary to determine the species' range and complete the description of the male. The species is protected in two protected areas but faces threats from habitat loss due to urbanization around East London and Kei Mouth, and agricultural activities near Mazeppa Bay and Coffee Bay.
