= List of vegetation types of South Africa =

Defined groups of plant communities with similar biotic and abiotic features

Vegetation types of South Africa.

This article lists the diverse vegetation types of South Africa, Lesotho, and Eswatini that have been sampled, classified, described, and mapped by the SANBI VEGMAP project. The resulting vegetation map and its associated database are crucial resources for biodiversity planning and research. The project is ongoing, with updates released as more data becomes available. The first map was published in 2006, with subsequent updates in 2009, 2012, 2018, and 2024. The 2018 revision was the most significant to date, with 47 vegetation types added, 35 removed, and numerous boundary edits. This update also ensured the vegetation map was fully aligned with the National Biodiversity Assessment 2018.

The classification system arranges vegetation types hierarchically within nine defined biomes and a tenth azonal group. Within the biomes, the system describes bioregions, with the vegetation types representing the most detailed level. Each vegetation type consists of a group of plant communities with similar biotic and abiotic features. Using a GIS, the vegetation types are plotted on the map at the highest available resolution.

The mapping of the distribution and extent of South Africa's natural vegetation began in 1918 with the establishment of the Botanical Survey of the Union of South Africa. Previous national vegetation maps by Pole-Evans (1936), Acocks (1953), and Low and Rebelo (1996) preceded the current system, which is a collaborative effort involving participants from various centres across the country.

== Savanna ==
Savanna biome vegetation types.

88 Savanna vegetation types, code SV:

"List of Savanna vegetation types"
- Andesite Mountain Bushveld (SVcb 11)
- Aoub Duneveld (SVkd 3)
- Barberton Serpentine Sourveld (SVl 13)
- Bhisho Thornveld (SVs 7)
- Cathedral Mopane Bushveld (SVmp 3)
- Central Sandy Bushveld (SVcb 12)
- Delagoa Lowveld (SVl 4)
- Dwaalboom Thornveld (SVcb 1)
- Dwarsberg-Swartruggens Mountain Bushveld (SVcb 4)
- Eastern Valley Bushveld (SVs 6)
- Gabbro Grassy Bushveld (SVl 6)
- Gauteng Shale Mountain Bushveld (SVcb 10)
- Ghaap Plateau Vaalbosveld (SVk 7)
- Gold Reef Mountain Bushveld (SVcb 9)
- Gordonia Duneveld (SVkd 1)
- Gordonia Kameeldoring Bushveld (SVkd 2)
- Gordonia Plains Shrubland (SVk 16)
- Granite Lowveld (SVl 3)
- Gravelotte Rocky Bushveld (SVl 7)
- Kaalrug Mountain Bushveld (SVl 12)
- Kathu Bushveld (SVk 12)
- Kimberley Thornveld (SVk 4)
- Koranna-Langeberg Mountain Bushveld (SVk 15)
- Kuruman Mountain Bushveld (SVk 10)
- Kuruman Thornveld (SVk 9)
- Kuruman Vaalbosveld (SVk 8)
- KwaZulu-Natal Hinterland Thornveld (SVs 3)
- KwaZulu-Natal Sandstone Sourveld (SVs 5)
- Lebombo Summit Sourveld (SVl 17)
- Legogote Sour Bushveld (SVl 9)
- Limpopo Ridge Bushveld (SVmp 2)
- Limpopo Sweet Bushveld (SVcb 19)
- Loskop Mountain Bushveld (SVcb 13)
- Loskop Thornveld (SVcb 14)
- Lowveld Rugged Mopaneveld (SVmp 6)
- Madikwe Dolomite Bushveld (SVcb 2)
- Mafikeng Bushveld (SVk 1)
- Makatini Clay Thicket (SVl 21)
- Makhado Sweet Bushveld (SVcb 20)
- Makuleke Sandy Bushveld (SVl 1)
- Malelane Mountain Bushveld (SVl 11)
- Mamabolo Mountain Bushveld (SVcb 24)
- Marikana Thornveld (SVcb 6)
- Molopo Bushveld (SVk 11)
- Moot Plains Bushveld (SVcb 8)
- Mopane Basalt Shrubland (SVmp 4)
- Mopane Gabbro Shrubland (SVmp 8)
- Musina Mopane Bushveld (SVmp 1)
- Ngongoni Veld (SVs 4)
- Norite Koppies Bushveld (SVcb 7)
- Northern Lebombo Bushveld (SVl 15)
- Northern Zululand Sourveld (SVl 22)
- Nossob Bushveld (SVkd 4)
- Nwambyia-Pumbe Sandy Bushveld (SVl 2)
- Ohrigstad Mountain Bushveld (SVcb 26)
- Olifantshoek Plains Thornveld (SVk 13)
- Phalaborwa-Timbavati Mopaneveld (SVmp 7)
- Pilanesberg Mountain Bushveld (SVcb 5)
- Polokwane Plateau Bushveld (SVcb 23)
- Postmasburg Thornveld (SVk 14)
- Poung Dolomite Mountain Bushveld (SVcb 25)
- Pretoriuskop Sour Bushveld (SVl 10)
- Roodeberg Bushveld (SVcb 18)
- Schmidtsdrif Thornveld (SVk 6)
- Schweizer-Reneke Bushveld (SVk 3)
- Sekhukhune Mountain Bushveld (SVcb 28)
- Sekhukhune Plains Bushveld (SVcb 27)
- South Eastern Coastal Thornveld (SVs 8)
- Southern Lebombo Bushveld (SVl 16)
- Soutpansberg Mountain Bushveld (SVcb 21)
- Springbokvlakte Thornveld (SVcb 15)
- Stella Bushveld (SVk 2)
- Swaziland Sour Bushveld (SVl 14)
- Tembe Sandy Bushveld (SVl 18)
- Thukela Thornveld (SVs 2)
- Thukela Valley Bushveld (SVs 1)
- Tsende Mopaneveld (SVmp 5)
- Tshokwane-Hlane Basalt Lowveld (SVl 5)
- Tzaneen Sour Bushveld (SVl 8)
- Vaalbos Rocky Shrubland (SVk 5)
- VhaVenda Miombo (SVcb 22)
- Waterberg Mountain Bushveld (SVcb 17)
- Western Maputaland Clay Bushveld (SVl 20)
- Western Maputaland Sandy Bushveld (SVl 19)
- Western Sandy Bushveld (SVcb 16)
- Zeerust Thornveld (SVcb 3)
- Zululand Coastal Thornveld (SVl 24)
- Zululand Lowveld (SVl 23)

== Grassland ==
Grassland biome vegetation types.

73 Grassveld (Grassland) vegetation types, code G:

List of Grassland vegetation types
- Aliwal North Dry Grassland (Gh 2)
- Amathole Mistbelt Grassland (Gd 2)
- Amathole Montane Grassland (Gd 1)
- Amersfoort Highveld Clay Grassland (Gm 13)
- Barberton Montane Grassland (Gm 17)
- Basotho Montane Shrubland (Gm 5)
- Bedford Dry Grassland (Gs 18)
- Besemkaree Koppies Shrubland (Gh 4)
- Bloemfontein Dry Grassland (Gh 5)
- Bloemfontein Karroid Shrubland (Gh 8)
- Carletonville Dolomite Grassland (Gh 15)
- Central Free State Grassland (Gh 6)
- Drakensberg Afroalpine Heathland (Gd 10)
- Drakensberg Foothill Moist Grassland (Gs 10)
- Drakensberg-Amathole Afromontane Fynbos (Gd 6)
- East Griqualand Grassland (Gs 12)
- Eastern Free State Clay Grassland (Gm 3)
- Eastern Free State Sandy Grassland (Gm 4)
- Eastern Highveld Grassland (Gm 12)
- Egoli Granite Grassland (Gm 10)
- Frankfort Highveld Grassland (Gm 6)
- Income Sandy Grassland (Gs 7)
- Ithala Quartzite Sourveld (Gs 2)
- KaNgwane Montane Grassland (Gm 16)
- Karoo Escarpment Grassland (Gh 1)
- Klerksdorp Thornveld (Gh 13)
- KwaZulu-Natal Highland Thornveld (Gs 6)
- Leolo Summit Sourveld (Gm 20)
- Lesotho Highland Basalt Grassland (Gd 8)
- Low Escarpment Moist Grassland (Gs 3)
- Lydenburg Montane Grassland (Gm 18)
- Lydenburg Thornveld (Gm 21)
- Mabela Sandy Grassland (Gs 13)
- Midlands Mistbelt Grassland (Gs 9)
- Mooi River Highland Grassland (Gs 8)
- Mthatha Moist Grassland (Gs 14)
- Northern Drakensberg Highland Grassland (Gd 5)
- Northern Escarpment Afromontane Fynbos (Gm 24)
- Northern Escarpment Dolomite Grassland (Gm 22)
- Northern Escarpment Quartzite Sourveld (Gm 23)
- Northern Free State Shrubland (Gm 7)
- Northern KwaZulu-Natal Moist Grassland (Gs 4)
- Northern KwaZulu-Natal Shrubland (Gs 5)
- Northern Zululand Mistbelt Grassland (Gs 1)
- Paulpietersburg Moist Grassland (Gm 15)
- Queenstown Thornveld (Gs 16)
- Rand Highveld Grassland (Gm 11)
- Sekhukhune Montane Grassland (Gm 19)
- Senqu Montane Shrubland (Gm 2)
- Southern Drakensberg Highland Grassland (Gd 4)
- Southern KwaZulu-Natal Moist Grassland (Gs 11)
- Soutpansberg Summit Sourveld (Gm 28)
- Soweto Highveld Grassland (Gm 8)
- Steenkampsberg Montane Grassland (Gm 30)
- Stormberg Plateau Grassland (Gd 3)
- Strydpoort Summit Sourveld (Gm 27)
- Tarkastad Montane Shrubland (Gs 17)
- Tsakane Clay Grassland (Gm 9)
- Tsomo Grassland (Gs 15)
- uKhahlamba Basalt Grassland (Gd 7)
- Vaal Reefs Dolomite Sinkhole Woodland (Gh 12)
- Vaal-Vet Sandy Grassland (Gh 10)
- Vredefort Dome Granite Grassland (Gh 11)
- Wakkerstroom Montane Grassland (Gm 14)
- Waterberg-Magaliesberg Summit Sourveld (Gm 29)
- Western Free State Clay Grassland (Gh 9)
- Western Highveld Sandy Grassland (Gh 14)
- Western Lesotho Basalt Shrubland (Gd 9)
- Winburg Grassy Shrubland (Gh 7)
- Wolkberg Dolomite Grassland (Gm 26)
- Woodbush Granite Grassland (Gm 25)
- Xhariep Karroid Grassland (Gh 3)
- Zastron Moist Grassland (Gm 1)

== Fynbos ==
Fynbos biome vegetation types.

Following the 2018 SANBI update, the Fynbos Biome now includes 122 vegetation types. It comprises three main vegetation complexes based on climatic and soil (edaphic) features: Fynbos, Renosterveld, and Strandveld.

=== Fynbos ===
81 Fynbos vegetation types, code FF:

List of Fynbos vegetation types
- Agulhas Limestone Fynbos (FFl 1)
- Agulhas Sand Fynbos (FFd 7)
- Albertinia Sand Fynbos (FFd 9)
- Algoa Sandstone Fynbos (FFs 29)
- Atlantis Sand Fynbos (FFd 4)
- Bokkeveld Sandstone Fynbos (FFs 1)
- Boland Granite Fynbos (FFg 2)
- Breede Alluvium Fynbos (FFa 2)
- Breede Quartzite Fynbos (FFq 4)
- Breede Sand Fynbos (FFd 8)
- Breede Shale Fynbos (FFh 4)
- Canca Limestone Fynbos (FFl 3)
- Cape Flats Sand Fynbos (FFd 5)
- Cape Winelands Shale Fynbos (FFh 5)
- Cederberg Sandstone Fynbos (FFs 4)
- Central Coastal Shale Band Vegetation (FFb 4)
- Central Inland Shale Band Vegetation (FFb 3)
- De Hoop Limestone Fynbos (FFl 2)
- Eastern Coastal Shale Band Vegetation (FFb 6)
- Eastern Inland Shale Band Vegetation (FFb 5)
- Elgin Shale Fynbos (FFh 6)
- Elim Ferricrete Fynbos (FFf 1)
- Garden Route Granite Fynbos (FFg 5)
- Garden Route Shale Fynbos (FFh 9)
- Graafwater Sandstone Fynbos (FFs 2)
- Greyton Shale Fynbos (FFh 7)
- Grootrivier Quartzite Fynbos (FFq 5)
- Hangklip Sand Fynbos (FFd 6)
- Hawequas Sandstone Fynbos (FFs 10)
- Hopefield Sand Fynbos (FFd 3)
- Kamiesberg Granite Fynbos (FFg 1)
- Kango Conglomerate Fynbos (FFt 1)
- Knysna Sand Fynbos (FFd 10)
- Kogelberg Sandstone Fynbos (FFs 11)
- Kouebokkeveld Alluvium Fynbos (FFa 1)
- Kouebokkeveld Shale Fynbos (FFh 1)
- Kouga Grassy Sandstone Fynbos (FFs 28)
- Kouga Sandstone Fynbos (FFs 27)
- Leipoldtville Sand Fynbos (FFd 2)
- Loerie Conglomerate Fynbos (FFt 2)
- Lourensford Alluvium Fynbos (FFa 4)
- Matjiesfontein Quartzite Fynbos (FFq 3)
- Matjiesfontein Shale Fynbos (FFh 2)
- Montagu Shale Fynbos (FFh 8)
- Namaqualand Sand Fynbos (FFd 1)
- North Hex Sandstone Fynbos (FFs 7)
- North Kammanassie Sandstone Fynbos (FFs 25)
- North Langeberg Sandstone Fynbos (FFs 15)
- North Outeniqua Sandstone Fynbos (FFs 18)
- North Rooiberg Sandstone Fynbos (FFs 21)
- North Sonderend Sandstone Fynbos (FFs 13)
- North Swartberg Sandstone Fynbos (FFs 23)
- Northern Inland Shale Band Vegetation (FFb 1)
- Olifants Sandstone Fynbos (FFs 3)
- Overberg Sandstone Fynbos (FFs 12)
- Peninsula Granite Fynbos (FFg 3)
- Peninsula Sandstone Fynbos (FFs 9)
- Piketberg Sandstone Fynbos (FFs 6)
- Potberg Ferricrete Fynbos (FFf 2)
- Potberg Sandstone Fynbos (FFs 17)
- Robertson Granite Fynbos (FFg 4)
- South Hex Sandstone Fynbos (FFs 8)
- South Kammanassie Sandstone Fynbos (FFs 26)
- South Langeberg Sandstone Fynbos (FFs 16)
- South Outeniqua Sandstone Fynbos (FFs 19)
- South Rooiberg Sandstone Fynbos (FFs 22)
- South Sonderend Sandstone Fynbos (FFs 14)
- South Swartberg Sandstone Fynbos (FFs 24)
- Southern Cape Dune Fynbos (FFd 11)
- Stinkfonteinberge Quartzite Fynbos (FFq 1)
- Suurberg Quartzite Fynbos (FFq 6)
- Suurberg Shale Fynbos (FFh 10)
- Swartberg Altimontane Sandstone Fynbos (FFs 31)
- Swartberg Shale Fynbos (FFh 3)
- Swartland Alluvium Fynbos (FFa 3)
- Swartruggens Quartzite Fynbos (FFq 2)
- Swellendam Silcrete Fynbos (FFc 1)
- Tsitsikamma Sandstone Fynbos (FFs 20)
- Western Altimontane Sandstone Fynbos (FFs 30)
- Western Coastal Shale Band Vegetation (FFb 2)
- Winterhoek Sandstone Fynbos (FFs 5)

=== Renosterveld ===
Renosterveld was formally grouped under the Fynbos biome in 2018. It contains the highest concentration of threatened plant species in South Africa. There are 29 Renosterveld vegetation types, code FR:

List of Renosterveld vegetation types
- Baviaanskloof Shale Renosterveld (FRs 18)
- Breede Alluvium Renosterveld (FRa 1)
- Breede Shale Renosterveld (FRs 8)
- Central Mountain Shale Renosterveld (FRs 5)
- Central Ruêns Shale Renosterveld (FRs 12)
- Ceres Shale Renosterveld (FRs 4)
- Eastern Ruêns Shale Renosterveld (FRs 13)
- Hantam Plateau Dolerite Renosterveld (FRd 2)
- Humansdorp Shale Renosterveld (FRs 19)
- Kango Limestone Renosterveld (FRl 1)
- Langkloof Shale Renosterveld (FRs 17)
- Matjiesfontein Shale Renosterveld (FRs 6)
- Montagu Shale Renosterveld (FRs 7)
- Mossel Bay Shale Renosterveld (FRs 14)
- Namaqualand Granite Renosterveld (FRg 1)
- Nieuwoudtville Shale Renosterveld (FRs 2)
- Nieuwoudtville-Roggeveld Dolerite Renosterveld (FRd 1)
- Peninsula Shale Renosterveld (FRs 10)
- Robertson Granite Renosterveld (FRg 3)
- Roggeveld Shale Renosterveld (FRs 3)
- Ruêns Silcrete Renosterveld (FRc 2)
- Swartberg Shale Renosterveld (FRs 15)
- Swartland Alluvium Renosterveld (FRa 2)
- Swartland Granite Renosterveld (FRg 2)
- Swartland Shale Renosterveld (FRs 9)
- Swartland Silcrete Renosterveld (FRc 1)
- Uniondale Shale Renosterveld (FRs 16)
- Vanrhynsdorp Shale Renosterveld (FRs 1)
- Western Ruêns Shale Renosterveld (FRs 11)

=== Strandveld ===
Strandveld units are retained within the Fynbos Biome. There are 9 Strandveld vegetation types, code FS:

List of Strandveld vegetation types
- Blombos Strandveld (FS 8)
- Cape Flats Dune Strandveld (FS 6)
- Groot Brak Dune Strandveld (FS 9)
- Lambert's Bay Strandveld (FS 1)
- Langebaan Dune Strandveld (FS 5)
- Overberg Dune Strandveld (FS 7)
- Saldanha Flats Strandveld (FS 3)
- Saldanha Granite Strandveld (FS 2)
- Saldanha Limestone Strandveld (FS 4)

== Succulent Karoo ==
Succulent Karoo biome vegetation types.

65 Succulent Karoo vegetation types, code SK:

List of Succulent Karoo vegetation types
- Aggeneys Gravel Vygieveld (SKr 19)
- Agter-Sederberg Shrubland (SKv 3)
- Anenous Plateau Shrubland (SKr 15)
- Bushmanland Inselberg Shrubland (SKr 18)
- Central Knersvlakte Vygieveld (SKk 2)
- Central Richtersveld Mountain Shrubland (SKr 1)
- Citrusdal Vygieveld (SKk 7)
- Die Plate Succulent Shrubland (SKr 10)
- Doringrivier Quartzite Karoo (SKv 1)
- Eastern Little Karoo (SKv 11)
- Eenriet Plains Succulent Shrubland (SKr 17)
- Goariep Mountain Succulent Shrubland (SKr 3)
- Hantam Karoo (SKt 2)
- Kamiesberg Mountains Shrubland (SKn 6)
- Klawer Sandy Shrubland (SKs 13)
- Knersvlakte Dolomite Vygieveld (SKk 6)
- Knersvlakte Quartz Vygieveld (SKk 3)
- Knersvlakte Shale Vygieveld (SKk 4)
- Koedoesberge-Moordenaars Karoo (SKv 6)
- Kosiesberg Succulent Shrubland (SKr 12)
- Lekkersing Succulent Shrubland (SKr 4)
- Little Karoo Quartz Vygieveld (SKv 10)
- Namaqualand Arid Grassland (SKs 11)
- Namaqualand Blomveld (SKn 3)
- Namaqualand Coastal Duneveld (SKs 8)
- Namaqualand Heuweltjie Strandveld (SKs 14)
- Namaqualand Heuweltjieveld (SKn 4)
- Namaqualand Inland Duneveld (SKs 9)
- Namaqualand Klipkoppe Shrubland (SKn 1)
- Namaqualand Shale Shrubland (SKn 2)
- Namaqualand Spinescent Grassland (SKs 12)
- Namaqualand Strandveld (SKs 7)
- Northern Knersvlakte Vygieveld (SKk 1)
- Northern Richtersveld Scorpionstailveld (SKr 7)
- Northern Richtersveld Yellow Duneveld (SKs 2)
- Oograbies Plains Sandy Grassland (SKs 6)
- Piketberg Quartz Succulent Shrubland (SKk 8)
- Platbakkies Succulent Shrubland (SKn 5)
- Prince Albert Succulent Karoo (SKv 13)
- Richtersveld Coastal Duneveld (SKs 1)
- Richtersveld Red Duneveld (SKs 5)
- Richtersveld Sandy Coastal Scorpionstailveld (SKs 4)
- Riethuis-Wallekraal Quartz Vygieveld (SKs 10)
- Robertson Karoo (SKv 7)
- Roggeveld Karoo (SKt 3)
- Rooiberg Quartz Vygieveld (SKr 11)
- Rosyntjieberg Succulent Shrubland (SKr 8)
- Southern Namaqualand Quartzite Klipkoppe Shrubland (SKk 10)
- Southern Richtersveld Inselberg Shrubland (SKr 14)
- Southern Richtersveld Scorpionstailveld (SKr 13)
- Southern Richtersveld Yellow Duneveld (SKs 3)
- Steytlerville Karoo (SKv 14)
- Stinkfonteinberge Eastern Apron Shrubland (SKr 6)
- Swartruggens Quartzite Karoo (SKv 2)
- Tanqua Escarpment Shrubland (SKv 4)
- Tanqua Karoo (SKv 5)
- Tatasberg Mountain Succulent Shrubland (SKr 9)
- Umdaus Mountains Succulent Shrubland (SKr 16)
- Upper Annisvlakte Succulent Shrubland (SKr 2)
- Vanrhynsdorp Gannabosveld (SKk 5)
- Vyftienmyl se Berge Succulent Shrubland (SKr 5)
- Western Bushmanland Klipveld (SKt 1)
- Western Gwarrieveld (SKv 9)
- Western Little Karoo (SKv 8)
- Willowmore Gwarrieveld (SKv 12)

== Albany Thicket ==
Albany Thicket biome vegetation types

As a result of the 2018 update, the number of Albany thickets vegetation types increased to 44. The list below contains 45 types from the 2012 map.

List of Albany Thicket vegetation types
- Albany Arid Thicket (AT 15)
- Albany Bontveld (AT 16)
- Albany Mesic Thicket (AT 17)
- Albany Valley Thicket (AT 18)
- Baviaans Valley Thicket (AT 19)
- Bethelsdorp Bontveld (AT 20)
- Buffels Mesic Thicket (AT 21)
- Buffels Valley Thicket (AT 22)
- Crossroads Grassland Thicket (AT 23)
- Doubledrift Karroid Thicket (AT 24)
- Eastern Gwarrieveld (AT 25)
- Elands Forest Thicket (AT 26)
- Escarpment Arid Thicket (AT 27)
- Escarpment Mesic Thicket (AT 28)
- Escarpment Valley Thicket (AT 29)
- Fish Arid Thicket (AT 30)
- Fish Mesic Thicket (AT 31)
- Fish Valley Thicket (AT 32)
- Gamka Arid Thicket (AT 33)
- Gamka Valley Thicket (AT 34)
- Geluk Grassland Thicket (AT 35)
- Goukamma Dune Thicket (AT 36)
- Gouritz Valley Thicket (AT 37)
- Grahamstown Grassland Thicket (AT 38)
- Grassridge Bontveld (AT 39)
- Hamburg Dune Thicket (AT 56)
- Hartenbos Dune Thicket (AT 40)
- Kasouga Dune Thicket (AT 41)
- Koedoeskloof Karroid Thicket (AT 42)
- Mons Ruber Fynbos Thicket (AT 43)
- Motherwell Karroid Thicket (AT 44)
- Nanaga Savanna Thicket (AT 45)
- Oudshoorn Karroid Thicket (AT 46)
- Saltaire Karroid Thicket (AT 47)
- Sardinia Forest Thicket (AT 48)
- St Francis Dune Thicket (AT 57)
- Subtropical Dune Thicket (AZs 3)
- Sundays Arid Thicket (AT 49)
- Sundays Mesic Thicket (AT 50)
- Sundays Valley Thicket (AT 51)
- Thorndale Forest Thicket (AT 52)
- Umtiza Forest Thicket (AT 53)
- Vanstadens Forest Thicket (AT 54)
- Western Gwarrieveld (AT 55)
- Willowmore Gwarrieveld (AT 58)

== Nama Karoo ==
Nama-Karoo biome vegetation types.

14 Nama Karoo vegetation types, code NK:

List of Nama Karoo vegetation types
- Albany Broken Veld (NKl 4)
- Blouputs Karroid Thornveld (NKb 2)
- Bushmanland Arid Grassland (NKb 3)
- Bushmanland Basin Shrubland (NKb 6)
- Bushmanland Sandy Grassland (NKb 4)
- Eastern Lower Karoo (NKl 2)
- Eastern Upper Karoo (NKu 4)
- Gamka Karoo (NKl 1)
- Kalahari Karroid Shrubland (NKb 5)
- Lower Gariep Broken Veld (NKb 1)
- Lower Karoo Gwarrieveld (NKl 3)
- Northern Upper Karoo (NKu 3)
- Upper Karoo Hardeveld (NKu 2)
- Western Upper Karoo (NKu 1)

== Azonal ==
Azonal vegetation types.

The Azonal group was reduced from 34 to 18 types in the 2018 map revision due to the reassignment of several estuarine and wetland units. The list below reflects the 35 types on the 2012 map, code AZ:

List of Azonal vegetation types
- Albany Alluvial Vegetation (AZa 6)
- Albany Dune Strandveld (AZs 2)
- Algoa Dune Strandveld (AZs 1)
- Arid Estuarine Salt Marshes (AZe 1)
- Bushmanland Vloere (AZi 5)
- Cape Estuarine Salt Marshes (AZe 2)
- Cape Inland Salt Pans (AZi 9)
- Cape Lowland Alluvial Vegetation (AZa 2)
- Cape Lowland Freshwater Wetlands (AZf 1)
- Cape Seashore Vegetation (AZd 3)
- Cape Vernal Pools (AZf 2)
- Drakensberg Wetlands (AZf 4)
- Eastern Temperate Freshwater Wetlands (AZf 3)
- Fynbos Riparian Vegetation (AZa 1)
- Highveld Alluvial Vegetation (AZa 5)
- Highveld Salt Pans (AZi 10)
- Lesotho Mires (AZf 5)
- Lower Gariep Alluvial Vegetation (AZa 3)
- Muscadel Riviere (AZi 8)
- Namaqualand Riviere (AZi 1)
- Namaqualand Salt Pans (AZi 2)
- Namaqualand Seashore Vegetation (AZd 2)
- Namib Seashore Vegetation (AZd 1)
- Southern Kalahari Mekgacha (AZi 3)
- Southern Kalahari Salt Pans (AZi 4)
- Southern Karoo Riviere (AZi 6)
- Subantarctic Kelp Bed Vegetation (Azm 2)
- Subtropical Alluvial Vegetation (AZa 7)
- Subtropical Dune Thicket (AZs 3)
- Subtropical Estuarine Salt Marshes (AZe 3)
- Subtropical Freshwater Wetlands (AZf 6)
- Subtropical Salt Pans (AZi 11)
- Subtropical Seashore Vegetation (AZd 4)
- Tanqua Wash Riviere (AZi 7)
- Upper Gariep Alluvial Vegetation (AZa 4)

== Forest ==
Forest biome vegetation types.

12 Forest vegetation types, code FO:

List of Forest vegetation types
- Ironwood Dry Forest (FOz 9)
- Lowveld Riverine Forest (FOa 1)
- Mangrove Forest (FOa 3)
- Northern Afrotemperate Forest (FOz 2)
- Northern Coastal Forest (FOz 7)
- Northern Mistbelt Forest (FOz 4)
- Sand Forest (FOz 8)
- Scarp Forest (FOz 5)
- Southern Afrotemperate Forest (FOz 1)
- Southern Coastal Forest (FOz 6)
- Southern Mistbelt Forest (FOz 3)
- Swamp Forest (FOa 2)

== Indian Ocean Coastal Belt ==
Indian Ocean Coastal Belt biome vegetation types.

5 Indian Ocean Coastal Belt vegetation types, code CB:

List of Indian Ocean Coastal Belt vegetation types
- KwaZulu-Natal Coastal Belt (CB 3)
- Maputaland Coastal Belt (CB 1)
- Maputaland Wooded Grassland (CB 2)
- Pondoland-Natal Sandstone Coastal Sourveld (CB 4)
- Transkei Coastal Belt (CB 5)

== Desert ==
Desert biome vegetation types.

15 Desert vegetation types, code D:

List of Desert vegetation types
- Alexander Bay Coastal Duneveld (Dn 1)
- Eastern Gariep Plains Desert (Dg 9)
- Eastern Gariep Rocky Desert (Dg 10)
- Helskloof Canyon Desert (Dg 6)
- Kahams Mountain Desert (Dg 5)
- Kwaggarug Mountain Desert (Dg 4)
- Namib Lichen Fields (Dn 2)
- Noms Mountain Desert (Dg 1)
- Northern Nababiepsberge Mountain Desert (Dg 7)
- Richtersberg Mountain Desert (Dg 2)
- Richtersveld Sheet Wash Desert (Dg 3)
- Southern Nababiepsberge Mountain Desert (Dg 8)
- Western Gariep Hills Desert (Dn 5)
- Western Gariep Lowland Desert (Dn 4)
- Western Gariep Plains Desert (Dn 3)

== Subantarctic ==
8 Subantarctic vegetation types, code ST:

List of Subantarctic vegetation types
- Subantarctic Biotic Herbfield and Grassland (ST 2)
- Subantarctic Cinder Cone Vegetation (ST 7)
- Subantarctic Coastal Vegetation (ST 1)
- Subantarctic Drainage Line Vegetation (ST 4)
- Subantarctic Fellfield (ST 6)
- Subantarctic Fernbrake Vegetation (ST 5)
- Subantarctic Mire (ST 3)
- Subantarctic Polar Desert (PD 1)
