= Hortipes irimus =

Scientific classification
- Kingdom: Animalia
- Phylum: Arthropoda
- Subphylum: Chelicerata
- Class: Arachnida
- Order: Araneae
- Infraorder: Araneomorphae
- Family: Corinnidae
- Genus: Hortipes
- Species: H. irimus

Binomial name
- Hortipes irimus Bosselaers & Jocqué, 2000

Species of spider

Hortipes irimus is a species of spider in the family Corinnidae. It is endemic to South Africa.

== Distribution ==
Hortipes irimus is endemic to KwaZulu-Natal province in South Africa. It is known only from the type locality at Port Shepstone.

== Etymology ==
The species' epithet is based on the word Irimu, the name of the were-leopard from local Chaga legends.

== Habitat and ecology ==
The species inhabits the Indian Ocean Coastal Belt biome at one meter above sea level. It is strongly associated with leaf litter in coastal woodland habitats and is a free-living ground-dweller.

== Description ==
Hortipes irimus is only known from female specimens. The carapace of the spider is a dark yellow colour, which transitions to a lighter yellow in the fovea. Its legs are yellow to dark yellow, ranging to light orange. The rest of the body including the abdomen and sternum are different shades of yellow, and there is no pattern present on its abdomen. The spider is 2.6 mm long, with a carapace length of about 1 mm and a width of around 0.8 mm.

== Conservation ==
Hortipes irimus is listed as Data Deficient for taxonomic reasons. More sampling is needed to collect males and determine the species' range. The species is threatened by habitat loss due to urbanization around Port Shepstone.
