= Hortipes atalante =

Umgeni basket-legged spider

Conservation status
- Vulnerable (SANBI Red List)

Scientific classification
- Kingdom: Animalia
- Phylum: Arthropoda
- Subphylum: Chelicerata
- Class: Arachnida
- Order: Araneae
- Infraorder: Araneomorphae
- Family: Corinnidae
- Genus: Hortipes
- Species: H. atalante

Binomial name
- Hortipes atalante Bosselaers & Jocqué, 2000

Species of spider

Hortipes atalante is a species of spider in the family Corinnidae. It is endemic to South Africa and is commonly known as the Umgeni basket-legged spider.

== Distribution ==
Hortipes atalante is endemic to KwaZulu-Natal province in South Africa. It has been recorded from Ithala Game Reserve, Krantzkloof Nature Reserve, and Umgeni Valley Nature Reserve.

== Habitat and ecology ==
The species inhabits the Savanna biome at altitudes ranging from 475 to 1,243 m above sea level. These small free-running spiders are found in humus under bushes along river banks.

== Description ==
Hortipes atalante is known only from females.

== Conservation ==
Hortipes atalante is listed as Vulnerable by the South African National Biodiversity Institute due to its small distribution range. The species is protected in three protected areas, and more sampling is needed to collect males and determine the full extent of its range.
