= Hortipes rothorum =

Scientific classification
- Kingdom: Animalia
- Phylum: Arthropoda
- Subphylum: Chelicerata
- Class: Arachnida
- Order: Araneae
- Infraorder: Araneomorphae
- Family: Corinnidae
- Genus: Hortipes
- Species: H. rothorum

Binomial name
- Hortipes rothorum Bosselaers & Jocqué, 2000

Species of spider

Hortipes rothorum is a species of spider in the family Corinnidae. It is endemic to South Africa.

== Distribution ==
Hortipes rothorum is endemic to KwaZulu-Natal province in South Africa. It is known only from the type locality at Jackson's Falls on the Mhlatuzana River.

== Habitat and ecology ==
The species inhabits the Savanna biome at 583 m above sea level. It is found in leaf litter in woodland habitats.

== Description ==
Hortipes rothorum is known only from males.

== Conservation ==
Hortipes rothorum is listed as Data Deficient for taxonomic reasons. More sampling is needed to collect females and determine the species' range. The species is threatened by habitat loss for farming and infrastructure development.
