= Hortipes contubernalis =

Conservation status
- Least Concern (IUCN 3.1)

Scientific classification
- Kingdom: Animalia
- Phylum: Arthropoda
- Subphylum: Chelicerata
- Class: Arachnida
- Order: Araneae
- Infraorder: Araneomorphae
- Family: Corinnidae
- Genus: Hortipes
- Species: H. contubernalis

Binomial name
- Hortipes contubernalis Bosselaers & Jocqué, 2000

Species of spider

Hortipes contubernalis is a species of spider in the family Corinnidae. It is endemic to South Africa, and is commonly known as the Entebeni basket-legged spider.

== Distribution ==
Hortipes contubernalis is endemic to Limpopo province in South Africa. It is known from Entabeni State Forest, Hanglip Forest, and Lhuvhondo Nature Reserve.

== Habitat and ecology ==
The species inhabits Forest and Savanna biomes at altitudes ranging from 969 to 1,339 m above sea level. It is strongly associated with leaf litter in woodland habitats.

== Description ==
Hortipes contubernalis is known from both sexes.

== Conservation ==
Hortipes contubernalis is regarded as Rare due to its small restricted distribution range. The species is protected in Lhuvhondo Nature Reserve, and while there are farming activities around two localities, patches of indigenous forest remain where the species can thrive.
