= Delosperma leendertziae =

Scientific classification
- Kingdom: Plantae
- Clade: Tracheophytes
- Clade: Angiosperms
- Clade: Eudicots
- Order: Caryophyllales
- Family: Aizoaceae
- Genus: Delosperma
- Species: D. leendertziae

Binomial name
- Delosperma leendertziae N.E.Br.

Synonyms
- Delosperma vogtsii L.Bolus

Species of flowering plant

Delosperma leendertziae, commonly known as the Gauteng rock vygie, Gauteng sheepfig, or geel bergvygie, is a perennial succulent belonging to the Aizoaceae family. The species is endemic to the Gauteng and North West provinces. The plant has an extent of occurrence of 8,658 km². It is found in the Magaliesberg, the Roodepoort Ridge, and Suikerbosrand. There are ten subpopulations threatened by erosion, invasive plants, and uncontrolled fire management.
