= Delosperma gautengense =

Conservation status
- Endangered (IUCN 3.1)

- Vulnerable (SANBI Red List)

Scientific classification
- Kingdom: Plantae
- Clade: Tracheophytes
- Clade: Angiosperms
- Clade: Eudicots
- Order: Caryophyllales
- Family: Aizoaceae
- Genus: Delosperma
- Species: D. gautengense

Binomial name
- Delosperma gautengense H.E.K.Hartmann

Succulent endemic to Gauteng, South Africa

Delosperma gautengense, the Gold Reef sheepfig, is an endangered species of succulent endemic to the Magaliesberg mountain range in Gauteng, South Africa.

== Range and habitat ==
Delosperma gautengense is found amongst rocky outcrops on south-facing slopes in Gold Reef mountain bushveld and Gauteng shale mountain bushveld habitat (in the savanna biome in Gauteng). It is restricted to the Magaliesberg and related mountain ridges near Pretoria.

== Conservation status ==
The Gold Reef sheepfig is classified as Endangered in the IUCN Red List and Vulnerable in the SANBI Red List of South African Plants due to its small number of population groups, and threats from encroaching infrastructure development, livestock overgrazing, alien plant invasion and inappropriate fire management.
