= Carletonville Dolomite Grassland =

South African Veld

Carletonville Dolomite Grassland is a veld that stretches across most of Limpopo, South Africa, northwestern Eswatini, Mpumalanga, South Africa, and KwaZulu-Natal, South Africa. Located half a kilometer above the majority of South Africa, the area includes undulating plains complemented with rocky chert ridges, with an abundance of different plant species including Seriphium plumosum that form a complex mosaic when viewed aerially.

== Threats ==
Polokwane, a city that stands in the middle of the Limpopo portion of the grassland, had a population of 130,000 at the 2011 census, which puts pressure on the countless plant species who inhabit the grassland. As of 2006, the grassland was listed in 6 different, private conservation areas, but were still listed as a "vulnerable" area.
