= Eastern Temperate Freshwater Wetlands =

Freshwater wetland vegetation type in South Africa

Eastern Temperate Freshwater Wetlands are an azonal freshwater wetland vegetation type occurring mainly in the eastern interior of South Africa. Classified as unit AZf 3 in the national vegetation map, these wetlands are associated with valley bottoms, floodplains, pans, and poorly drained depressions across parts of Gauteng, Mpumalanga, Free State, and KwaZulu-Natal.

The vegetation is dominated by hydrophilic grasses, sedges, and rushes adapted to seasonal or permanent waterlogging. Common species include Phragmites australis, Typha capensis, and various Cyperus and Juncus species. These wetlands provide habitat for amphibians, waterbirds, and aquatic invertebrates, and play an important role in flood attenuation and water purification.

== Conservation ==
Eastern Temperate Freshwater Wetlands are considered threatened due to drainage, cultivation, urban expansion, and pollution. Many wetland systems in the Highveld and eastern escarpment regions have been degraded or fragmented, and only a small proportion is formally protected.

== See also ==
- Biodiversity of South Africa
- Highveld
