= Soweto Highveld Grassland =

Soweto Highveld Grassland (classification code Gm 8) is a vegetation type, in the provinces Free State, Gauteng, Mpumalanga, and North West of South Africa. It is 1,451,000 hectares big, or ~5600 square miles.

== Ecology ==
The grassland has its altitudes from 1420 to 1760 meters above sea level. Its grass is dense, with it mostly being Themeda triandra, but with it also containing Elionurus muticus, Eragrostis racemosa, Heteropogon contortus and Tristachya leucothrix. The region experiences a somewhat warm climate, with very hot summers and very cold winters.

== Conservation ==
As of the early 2010s, 47% of the land was already urbanized and/or industrialized. Only "a handful" of patches were protected, and in 2006, it was considered endangered.
