= Eastern Highveld Grassland =

Grassland vegetation type in South Africa

Eastern Highveld Grassland is a vegetation type of the Grassland Biome in eastern South Africa. It occurs primarily on the high‑altitude plains of Mpumalanga and parts of southern Gauteng, forming one of the dominant natural vegetation units of the Highveld plateau.

The vegetation is characterised by dense, species‑rich grassland dominated by tufted grasses, with scattered forbs and very few trees. The region experiences summer rainfall and frequent frost in winter. Much of the original habitat has been transformed by agriculture, mining, and urban expansion, particularly around the Gauteng metropolitan area.

== Conservation ==
Large portions of the Eastern Highveld Grassland are considered threatened due to habitat loss and fragmentation. Only a small percentage is formally protected, with remaining natural areas occurring mainly in nature reserves and isolated patches on privately owned land.

== See also ==
- Highveld
- Biodiversity of South Africa
