= Andesite Mountain Bushveld =

Southern Africa ecoregion

The Andesite Mountain Bushveld is a type of sub-tropical woodland ecoregion of Southern Africa. It is part of the Bushveld biome, which straddles the Tropic of Capricorn and constitutes the southern part of the Zambezian region.

== Flora and fauna ==
One of the endemic plant species found in this region is Ceropegia decidua subspecies pretoriensis, a succulent vine with tubular flowers that attract flies for pollination. This subspecies is classified as vulnerable by the South African National Biodiversity Institute (SANBI) due to its small population size, restricted distribution and potential threats from urban expansion, erosion and alien plant invasion. It is associated with ridges and quartzitic rocky outcrops in pockets of soil among rocks in direct sunshine or shaded areas.

== See also ==
- List of vegetation types of South Africa
