= Southern Mistbelt Forest =

The Southern Mistbelt Forest is a vegetation type in South Africa.

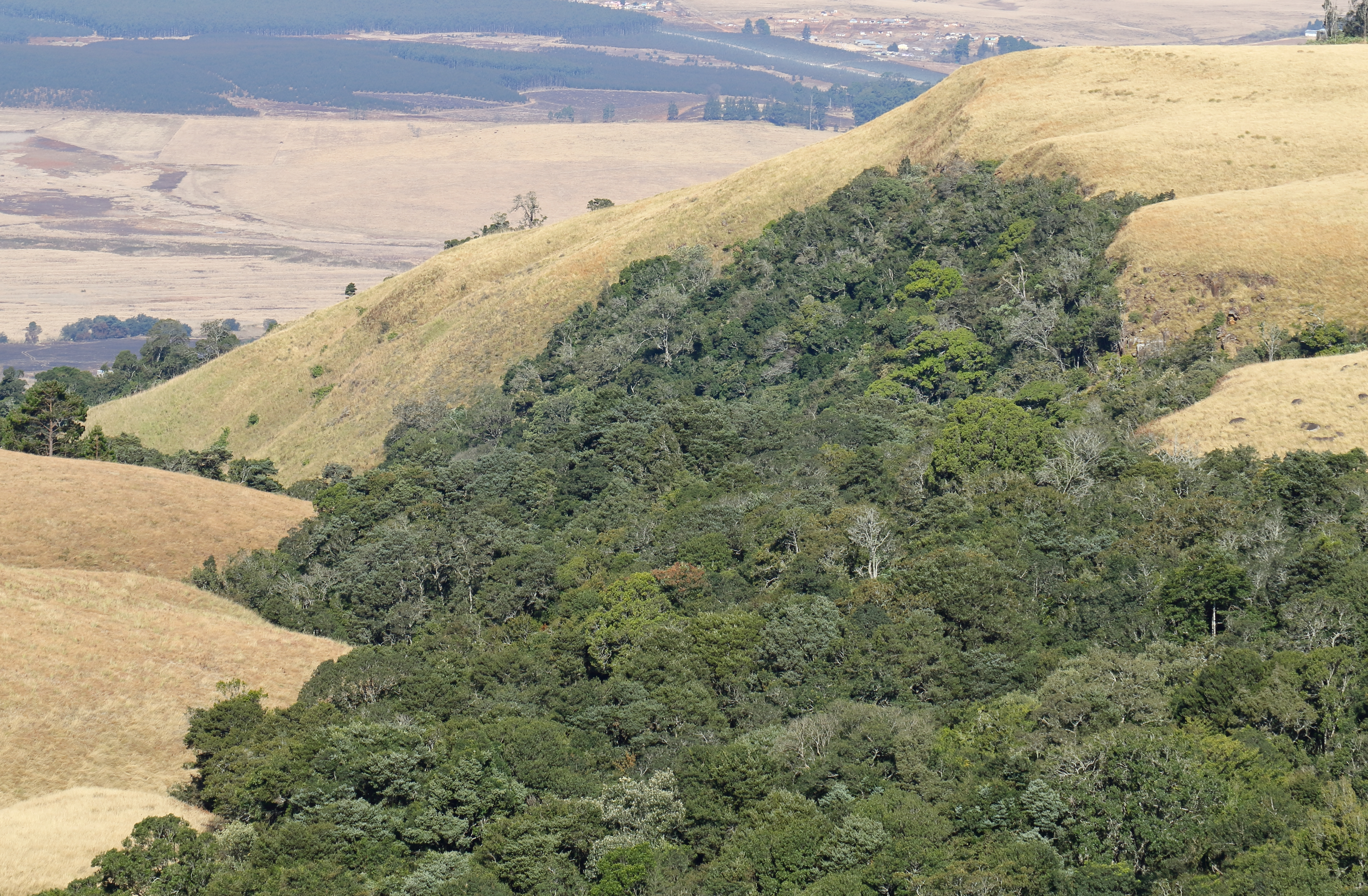
Southern Mistbelt Forest, Karkloof, KwaZulu-Natal

== Distribution ==
KwaZulu-Natal and Eastern Cape Provinces.

== Landscape ==
Forest patches in high-rainfall, fire-protected habitats on steep south-facing slopes. Altitudes range from 850 to 1 600 m, and mean annual rainfall generally exceeds 900 mm.

== Vegetation ==
In the Amathole Mountains and the KwaZulu-Natal Midlands, and on the Transkei Escarpment, these forests are characterized by their tall stature, reaching heights of 15–20 meters. They have a complex structure, with two layers of trees, a dense shrubby understorey, and a well-developed herb layer. On the low-altitude scarps, the forests are shorter and resemble scrub forests in some areas, but they are still home to a diverse range of species. While the tall forests exhibit a mix of coarse-grained dynamics driven by canopy gaps and disturbances, as well as fine-grained regeneration characteristics, the mistbelt forests in the Amathole region are primarily dominated by emergent trees such as Afrocarpus falcatus, along with various deciduous and semi-deciduous species including Celtis africana, Calodendrum capense, Vepris lanceolata, and Zanthoxylum davyi. In Transkei and the KwaZulu-Natal Midlands, Podocarpus henkelii becomes more prominent in the canopy layer. Deciduous species play a significant role in these forests.

== Geology and Soils ==
Some of the soils are deep loams and clays, developed on weathered dolerite intrusions or mudstones, shales and sandstones of the Karoo Supergroup; Their topsoils often have high concentrations of organic matter, which release sufficient nutrients for high productivity. The soils underlying lower-altitude forests that developed on more quartzitic rocks are shallower and less fertile.

== Conservation ==
About 8% of these forests are protected. In the Eastern Cape this includes parts of the Bosberg Nature Reserve, Greater Addo Elephant National Park, and Hogsback, Kologha, Isidenge, Kubusi, Katberg and Nabakyu State Forests. In KwaZulu-Natal they are protected in Impendle, Igxalingenwa, Karkloof and Qudeni Nature Reserves. Smaller forest patches are protected on private land. About 5% has been transformed for plantations. Invasive aliens include . Major threats include invasive alien plants (including Solanum mauritianum, and Rubus, Acacia, and Eucalyptus species), overexploitation of timber (for building and firewood) and non-timber forest products (for herbal medicines and livestock feed) together with mismanagement of fire and burning regimes in surrounding grasslands.
