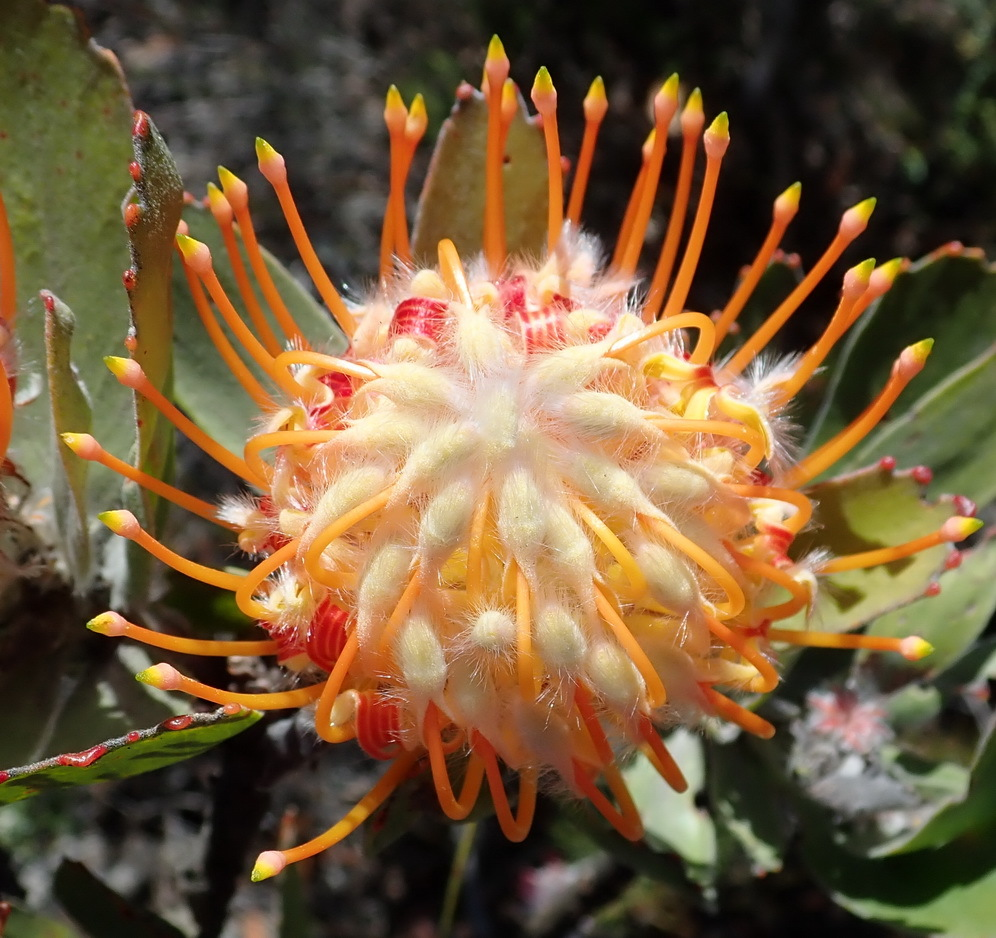
- photo: Nicola van Berkel

Conservation status
- Near Threatened (IUCN 3.1)

Scientific classification
- Kingdom: Plantae
- Clade: Embryophytes
- Clade: Tracheophytes
- Clade: Angiosperms
- Clade: Eudicots
- Order: Proteales
- Family: Proteaceae
- Genus: Leucospermum
- Species: L. pluridens

Binomial name
- Leucospermum pluridens Rourke

= Leucospermum pluridens =

Species of plant native to South Africa

Leucospermum pluridens is a large upright evergreen shrub of up to 3 m (9.8 ft) high assigned to the family Proteaceae. It has leathery, oblong to wedge-shaped leaves of about 7½ cm long and 2½ cm wide, deeply incised near the tip with seven to ten teeth. It has initially yellow, later carmine coloured flower heads. The 2 cm long bracts have slender, recurved tips. From the center of the perianth emerge long styles that jointly give the impression of a pincushion. It is called Robinson pincushion in English and Robinson-kreupelhout in Afrikaans. Flowers can be found between September and December. It naturally occurs in the south of South Africa.

== Description ==
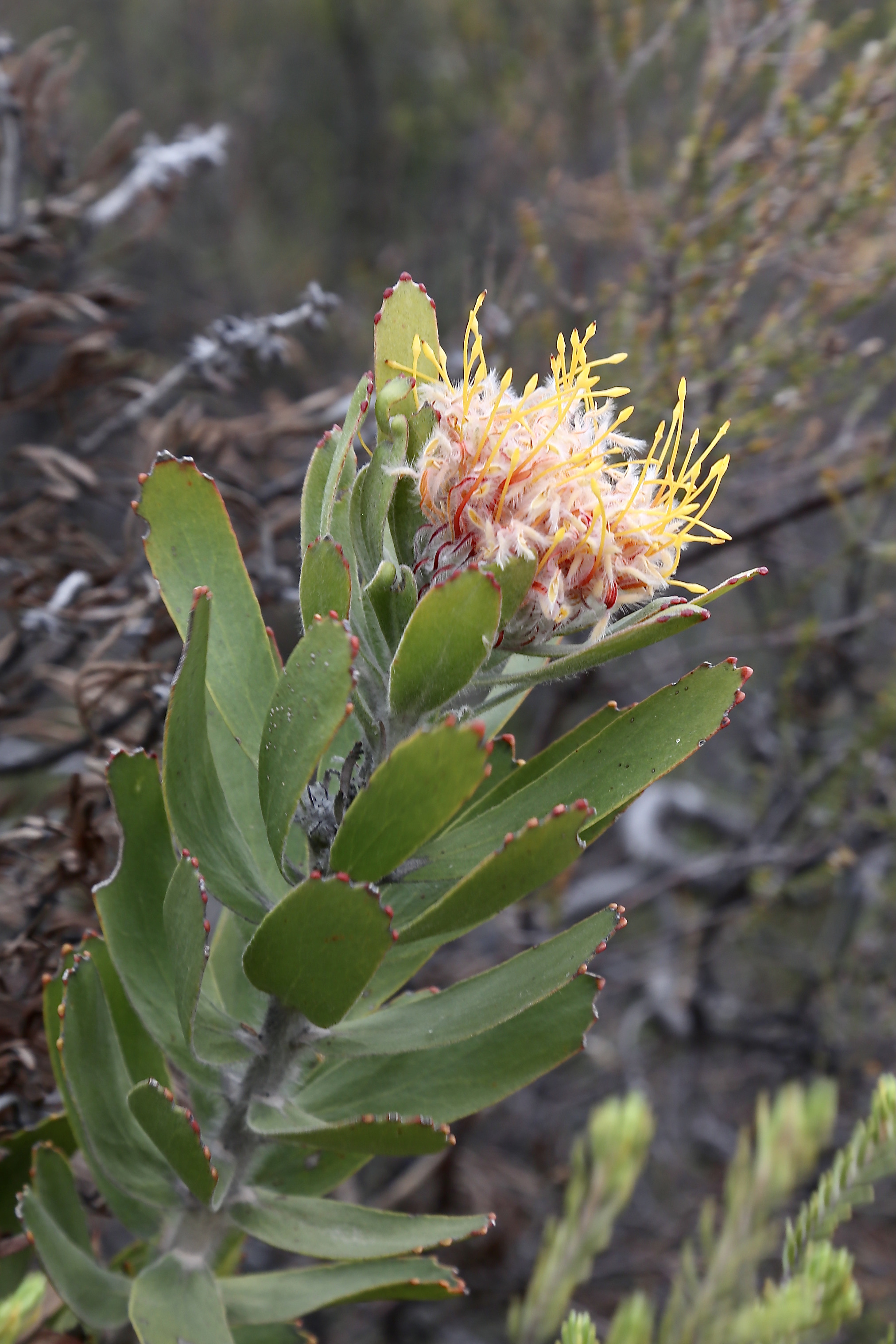
Leucospermum pluridens in Rooiberg Nature Reserve, Western Cape

Leucospermum pluridens is an upright, rigid, evergreen tree-like shrub of up to 3 m (9.8 ft) in diameter, that emerges from a woody trunk of up to 20 cm (7.9 in) in diameter. The trunk and lower branches are covered by a smooth grey bark. Characteristically, young plants branch only sparsely from the stiff upright stem, but older plants develop more branches. The flowering branches are stout and woody, 3/4–1 cm (0.3–0.4 in) across, with a thick grey felty or spiderweb-like covering consisting of short cringy hairs. The leaves are set alternately and slightly overlapping, hairless and leathery, oblong or broadly inverted lance-shaped to wedge-shaped, 5 1/2–10 cm (2.2–3.9 in) long and 2–3 1/2 cm (0.79–1.38 in) wide. The tip of the leaf is rounded, often deeply incised and bears seven to ten very prominent rounded teeth.

The flowerheads are egg-shaped, about 8 cm (3 1/4 in) high and 6 cm (2.4 in) across, seated or have a very short stalk, mostly individual but sometimes grouped with up to four together on a flowering branch. The common base of the flowers in the same head are narrowly cone-shaped with a pointy tip, 3 1/2–4 cm (1.4–1.6 in) long and about 1 cm (0.39 in) wide. The bracts subtending the head are oval, keeled, with a very long narrowing and hook-shaped tip, up to 2 cm (0.79 in) long, with a row of long hairs along the edges, the inner surface shiny and carmine-coloured in living specimens.

The bract subtending the individual flower is cartilaginous in consistency, keeled and wraps around the base of the flower, about 1 cm long and 6 mm wide, with long pointed tip that curves slightly inwards and with a row of long hairs along the edges. The perianth is 4-merous. The lower part of the perianth called tube, that remains merged when the flower is open, is about 10 mm (0.39 in) long, cylinder-shaped, somewhat compressed sideways, hairless at its foot and slightly powdery higher up. The middle part (or claws) is initially yellow, becoming bright carmine, roughly hairy on the inner surface, with long straight hairs between short felty hairs. The claw facing the middle is hairless near the base. The upper part (or limbs), which enclosed the pollen presenter in the bud, are broadly lance-shaped with a pointy tip, each about 5 mm long and 2 mm wide, felty, those facing the centre of the head and the sides with in addition long silky hairs. The limb facing the edge of the head is less densely felty than the other three. From the centre of the perianth emerges a slender tapering and the upper part slightly curved to the center of the head, style of 5–6 cm (2.0–2.4 in) long and about 1½ mm thick. The thickened part at the tip of the style called pollen presenter is orange in the lower half and yellow in the upper half, cone-shaped with a pointy tip, about 2 mm (0.079 in) long and 1 mm wide long, with a green groove that functions as the stigma across the very tip. The ovary is subtended by four white, awl-shaped scales of about 2 mm (0.079 in) long.

=== Differences with other species ===
Leucospermum pluridens differs from its close relative Leucospermum glabrum because it has felty to spiderweb-like, grey indumentum on the flowering branches, the pointy, narrowly cone-shaped acute common base of the flower head, exceptionally long (up to 2 cm) bracts subtending the flower with a long pointed and recurved tip and edges with a row of long hears and leaves with six to nine deep incisions.

== Taxonomy ==
As far as we know, Margaret Levyns was the first to collect of the Robinson pincushion in 1938 on the Rooiberg Pass, south of Calitzdorp. Since it also can be found on the north facing slopes of the Outeniqua Mountains near the Attaquas Kloof, which was traveled by Francis Masson, Carl Peter Thunberg and other collectors, it is curious that this striking shrub seems to have been overlooked for a very long time. John Patrick Rourke realised it was a new species, which he described in 1970 and called Leucospermum pluridens.

Leucospermum pluridens is assigned to the tree pincushions, section Conocarpodendron.

The species name pluridens is a compounding of the Latin words pluris meaning "many" and dens meaning "teeth".

== Distribution, habitat and ecology ==
The Robinson pincushion grows on the lower northern slopes of the Outeniqua Mountains near "Klein Moeras Rivier Spruiten", Saffraan Rivier and Kruis Pad, at 500–600 m (1,600–2,000 ft), and on the southeastern slopes of the Rooiberg at an altitude of 750–1,050 m (2,460–3,440 ft). On both locations, the species occur in the so-called Arid Fynbos, a transitional vegetation type on the interface between fynbos and Karoo. This is most evidently demonstrated at Kruis Pad where this species can be found associated with Aloe ferox and several Cotyledon, Elytropappus, and Restionaceae on dry, hot, north facing hills. Within the distribution of the Robinson pincushion the average annual precipitation is 250–400 mm (9.8–15.7 in). This makes the requirements (10–15 in annual precipitation) of L. pluridens quite different from those of its close relative, L. glabrum. The species also grows in the Baviaanskloof.

The fruits are ripe about two months after flowering, when they fall to the ground. Here they are gathered by ants that carry them to their underground nest, where they remain until they germinate after a fire has removed the overhead vegetation cover.

== Conservation ==
The Robinson pincushion is considered near threatened. Its distribution is severely fragmented, restricted to an area of 140 km^{2} (54 sq mi). For unknown reasons, its population size has declined in the past, but seems to have stabilised now.
