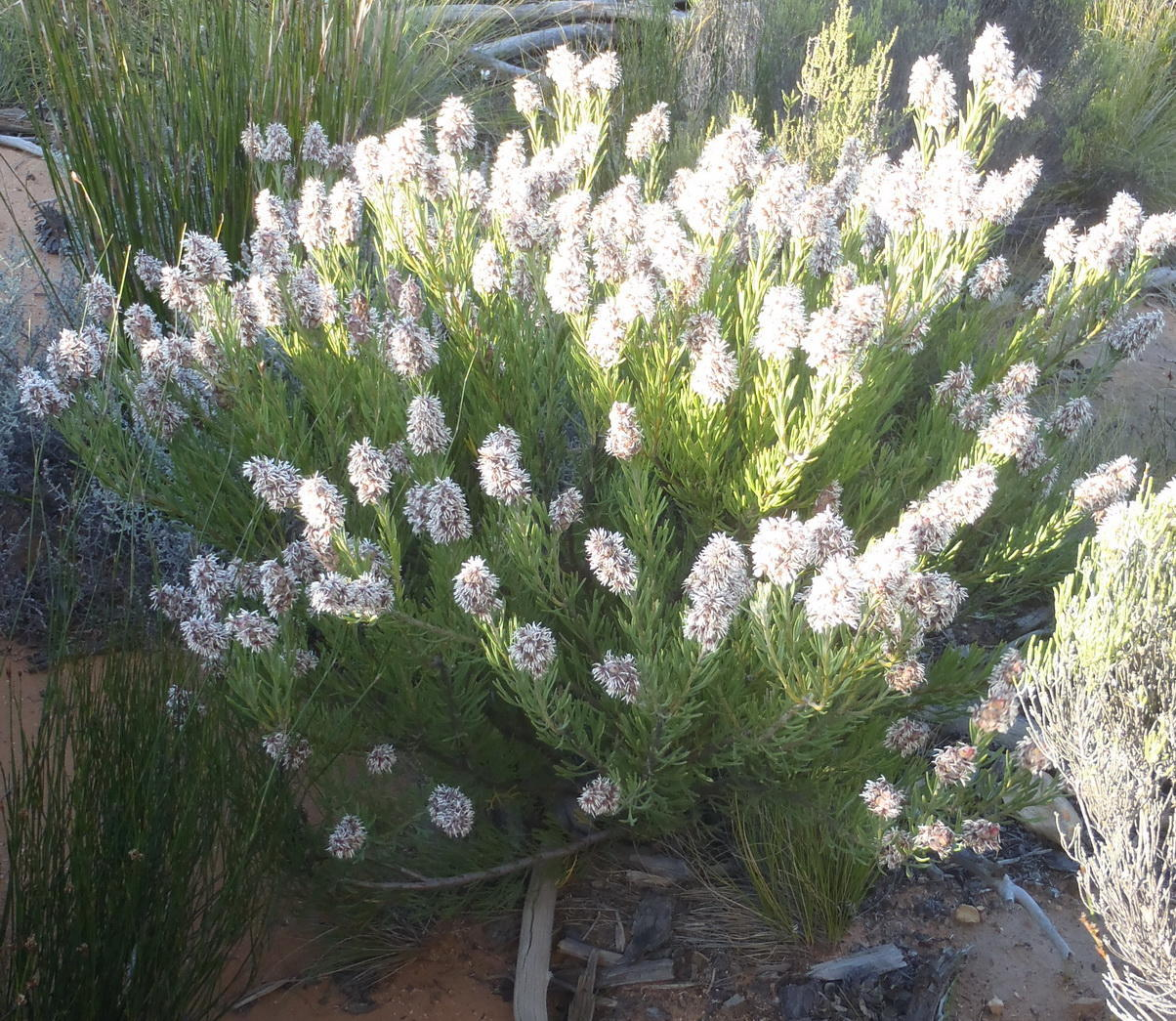

Conservation status
- Least Concern (IUCN 3.1)

Scientific classification
- Kingdom: Plantae
- Clade: Tracheophytes
- Clade: Angiosperms
- Clade: Eudicots
- Order: Proteales
- Family: Proteaceae
- Genus: Paranomus
- Species: P. dregei

Binomial name
- Paranomus dregei (H.Buek ex Meisn.) Kuntze

Synonyms
- Nivenia dregei H.Buek ex Meisn.; Nivenia marlothii E.Phillips; Paranomus marlothii (E.Phillips) N.E.Br.; Sorocephalus diversifolius Drège ex Meisn.

= Paranomus dregei =

Species of flowering plant

Paranomus dregei, the scented sceptre, is a flowering shrub belonging to the genus Paranomus. The plant is native to the Western Cape, South Africa.

== Description ==
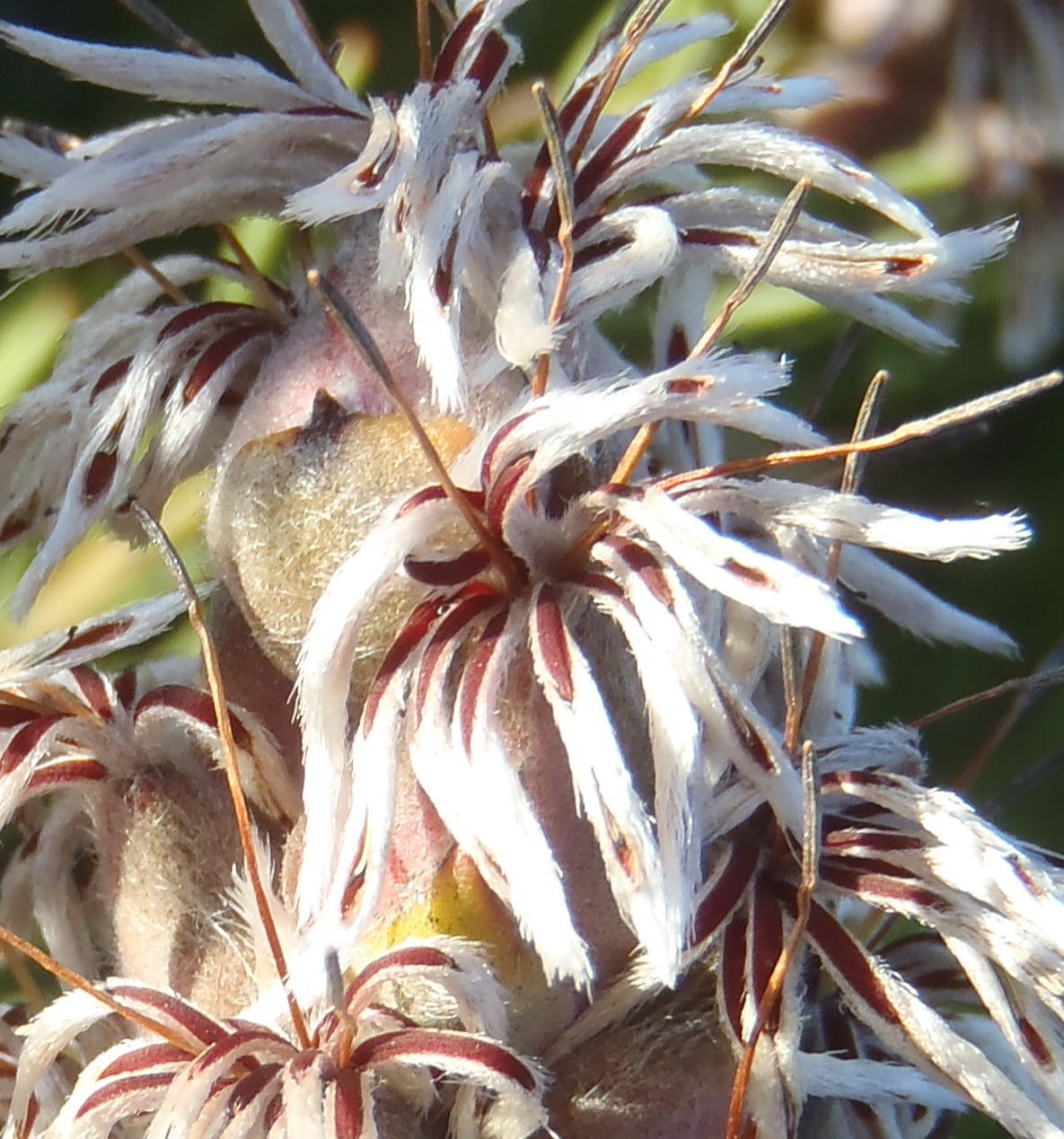

The shrub grows to 1.7 m (5.6 ft) tall and flowers mainly from May to October. Fire destroys the plant but the seeds survive. The plant is bisexual and pollinated by insects. The fruit ripens two months after flowering and the seeds fall to the ground where they are spread by ants.

In Afrikaans, it is known as Parfuumsepter.

== Distribution and habitat ==
The plant occurs from the Witteberg to the Swartberg, Anysberg, Touwsberg and Rooiberg, Kouga Mountains and Outeniqua Mountains. It grows in sandstone sand at altitudes of 900–1,400 m (3,000–4,600 ft).

== Gallery ==
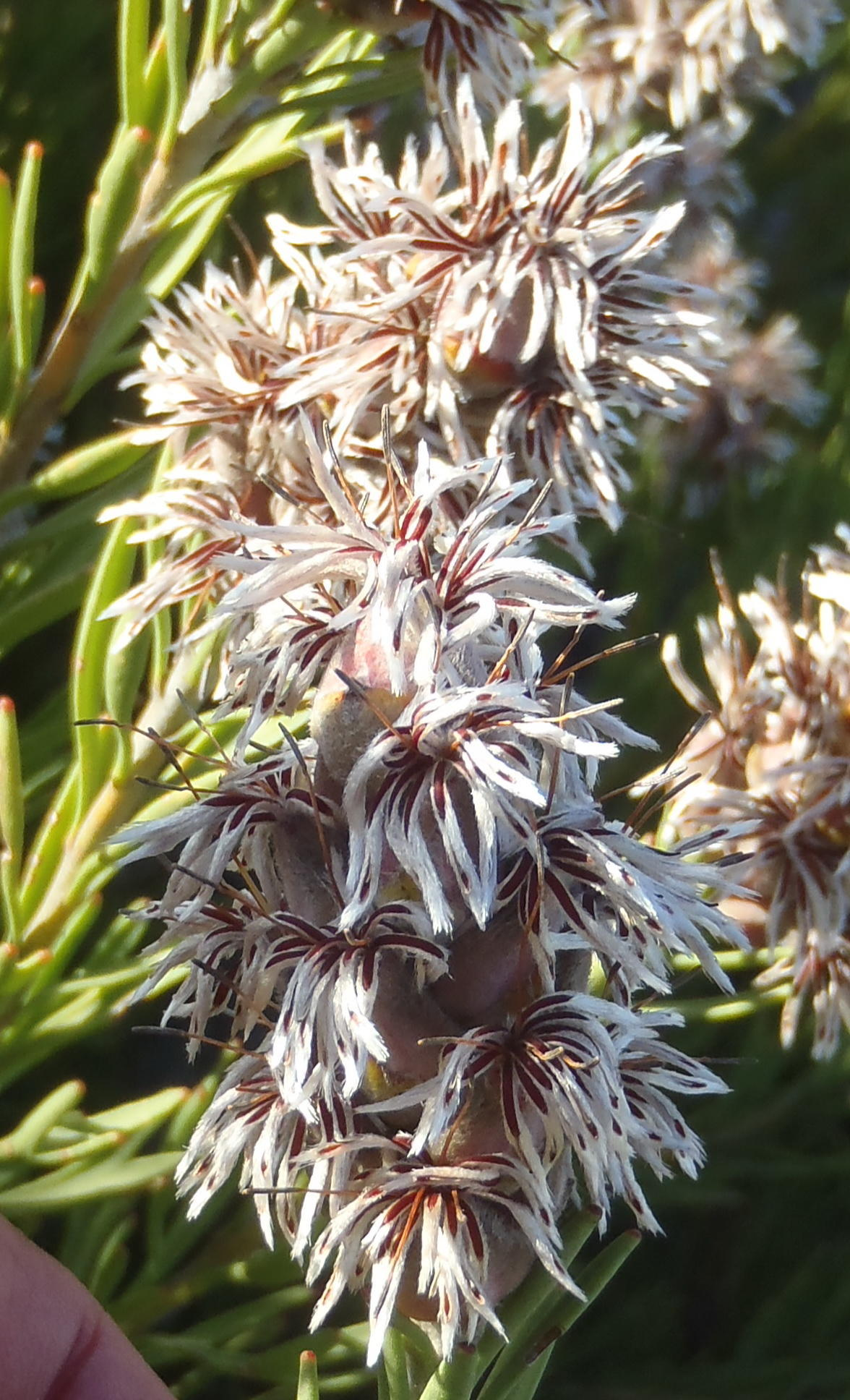

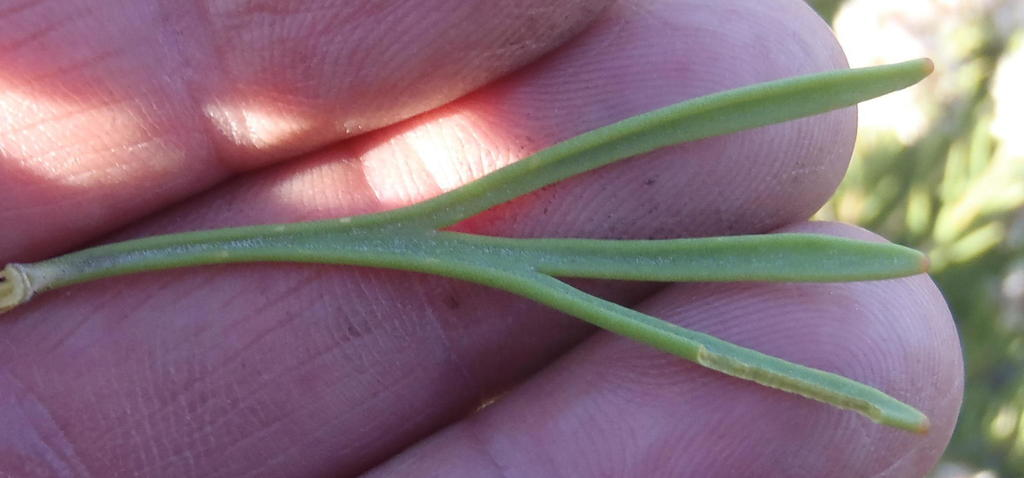

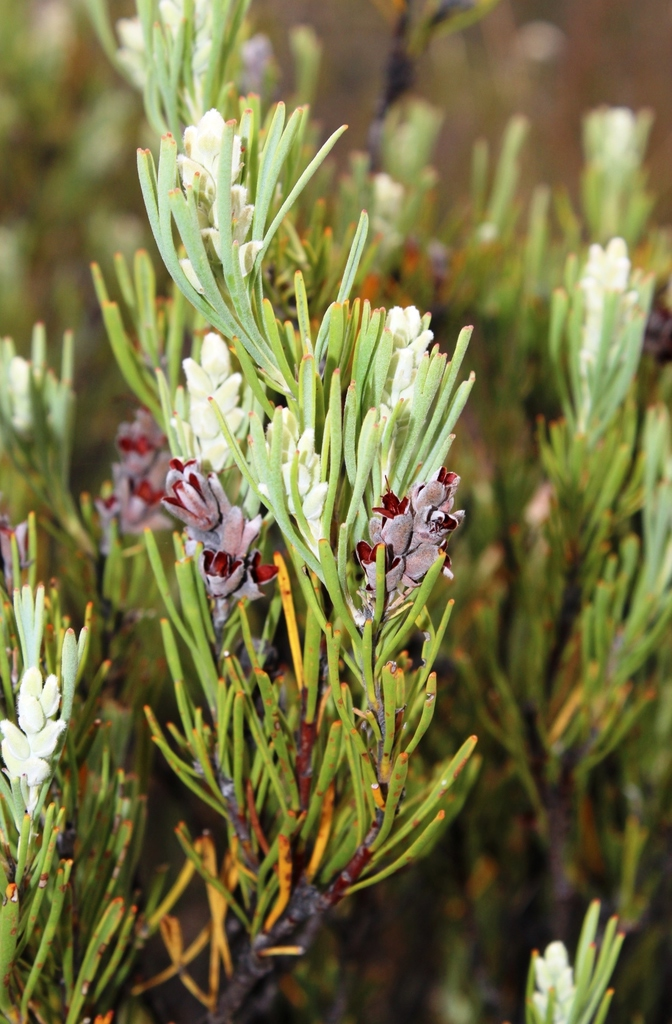
