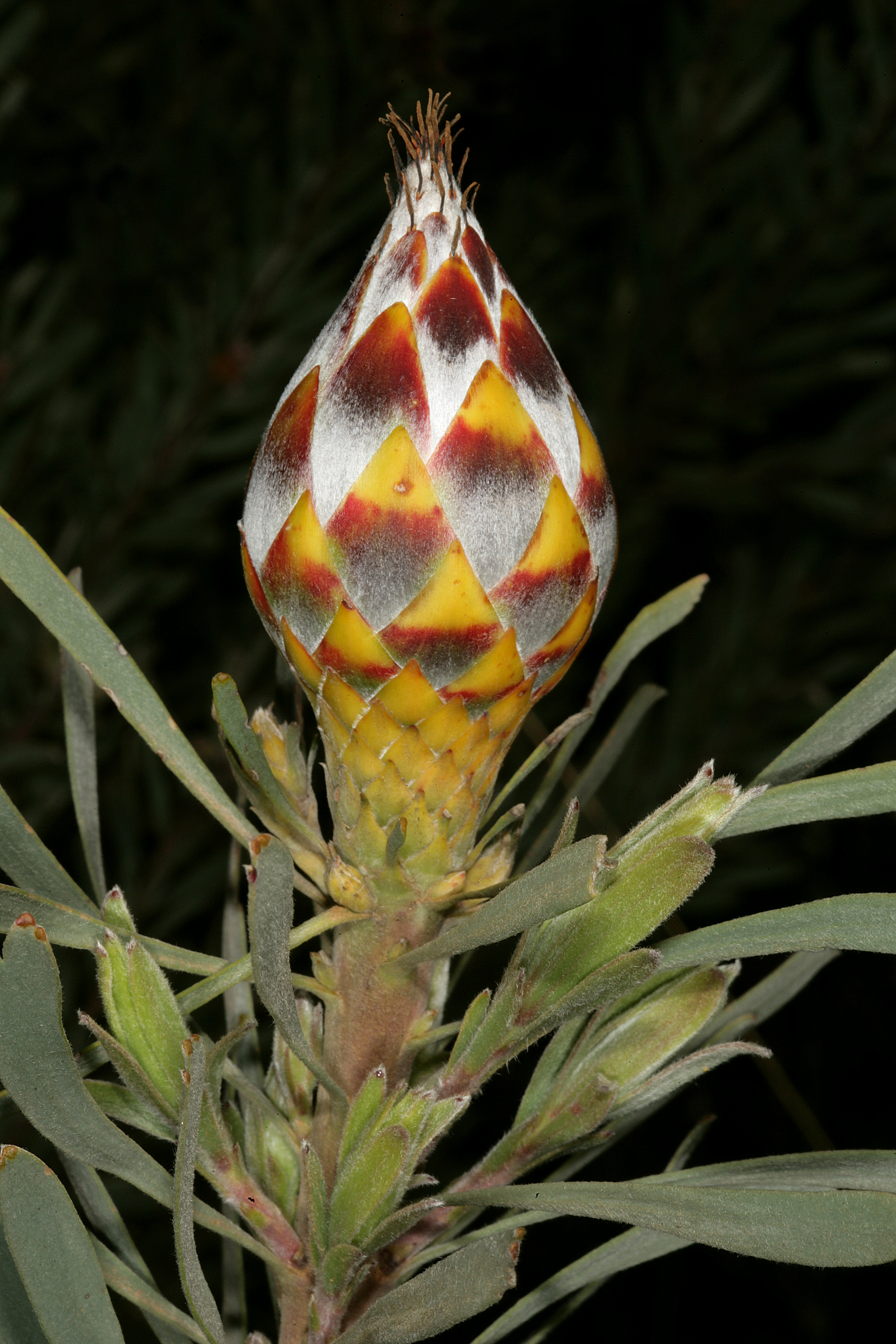

Conservation status
- Least Concern (IUCN 3.1)

Scientific classification
- Kingdom: Plantae
- Clade: Tracheophytes
- Clade: Angiosperms
- Clade: Eudicots
- Order: Proteales
- Family: Proteaceae
- Genus: Leucadendron
- Species: L. rubrum

Binomial name
- Leucadendron rubrum Burm.f.

= Leucadendron rubrum =

Species of plant

Leucadendron rubrum, the spinning top, is a flower-bearing shrub belonging to the genus Leucadendron and forms part of the fynbos. The plant is native to the Western Cape, South Africa.

== Description ==
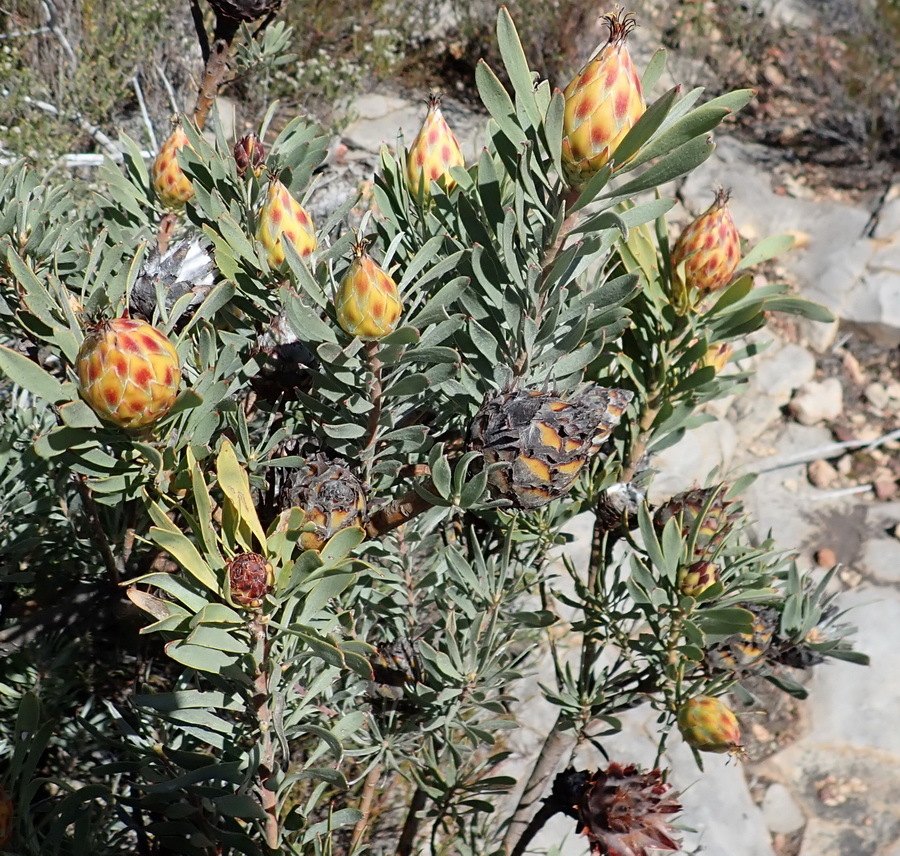

The shrub grows 2.5 m (8.2 ft) tall and flowers from August to September. Fire destroys the plant but the seeds survive. The seeds are stored in a toll on the female plant and are released where they are spread by the wind. The seed has a parachute mechanism that allows it to float and rotate through the air. The plant is unisexual and there are male and female plants that reproduce by wind pollination.

In Afrikaans, it is known as Dikkopeierbos.

== Distribution and habitat ==
The plant occurs in the Bokkeveld, Gifberg, Cederberg to the Hottentots Holland Mountains and Riviersonderend Mountains, Touwsberg, Rooiberg, Kammanassie Mountains, Piketberg, Table Mountain, and the Cape Flats. It grows mainly in granite or sandstone at altitudes of 250–1,500 m (820–4,920 ft).

== Gallery ==
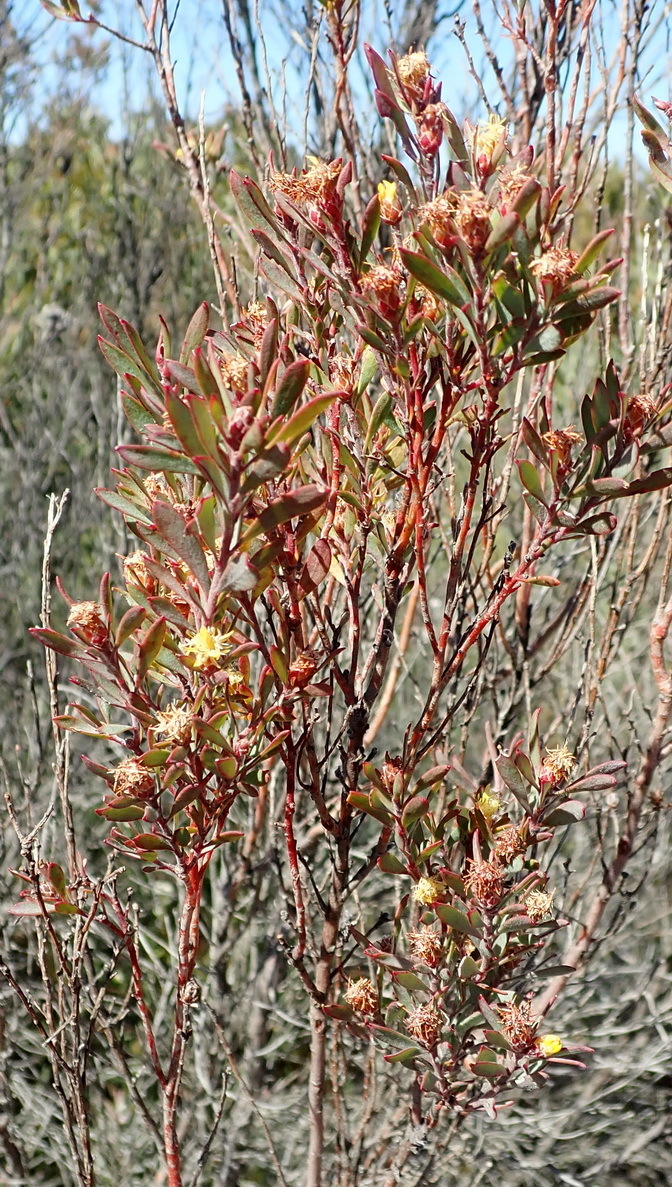

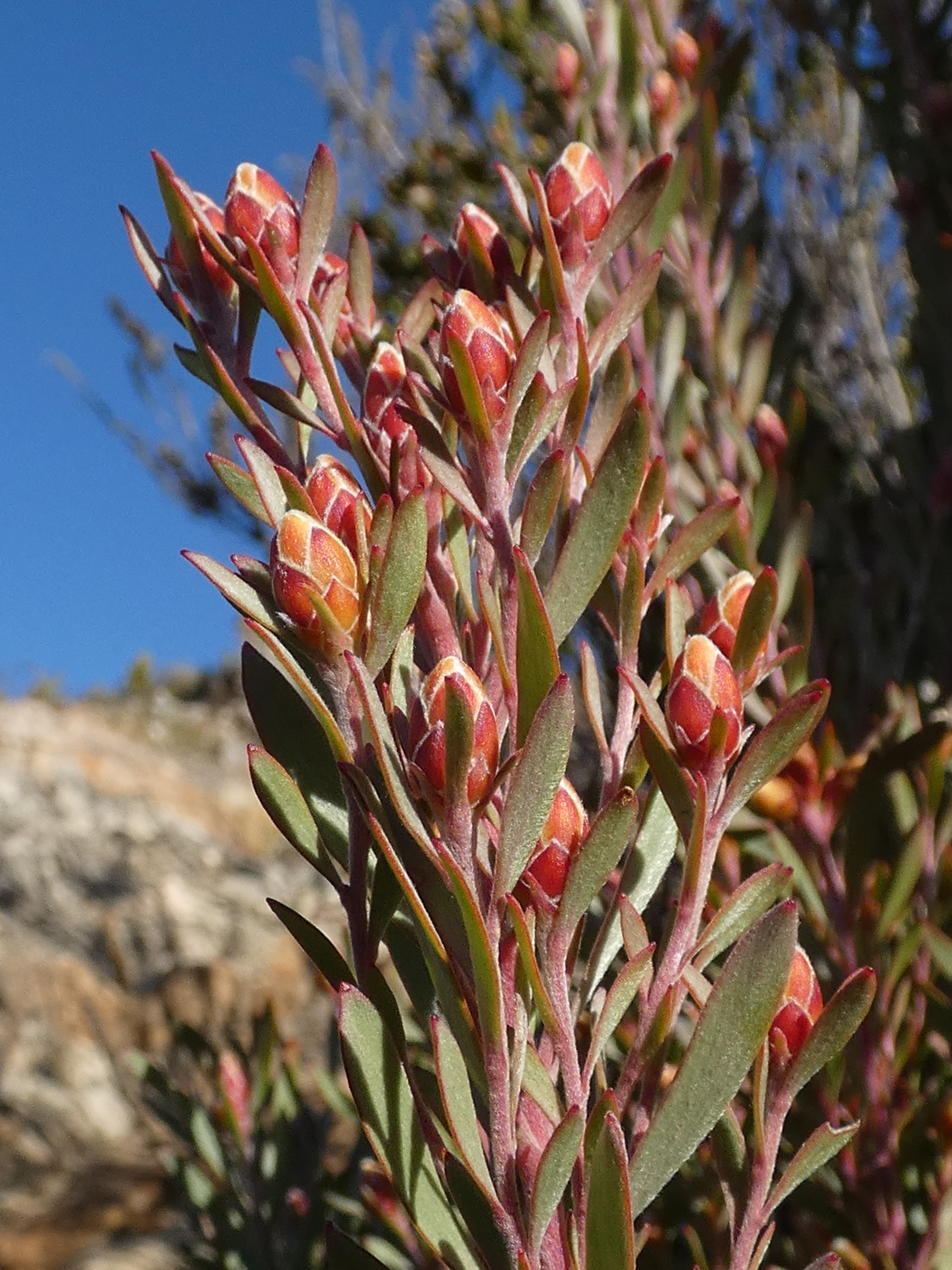

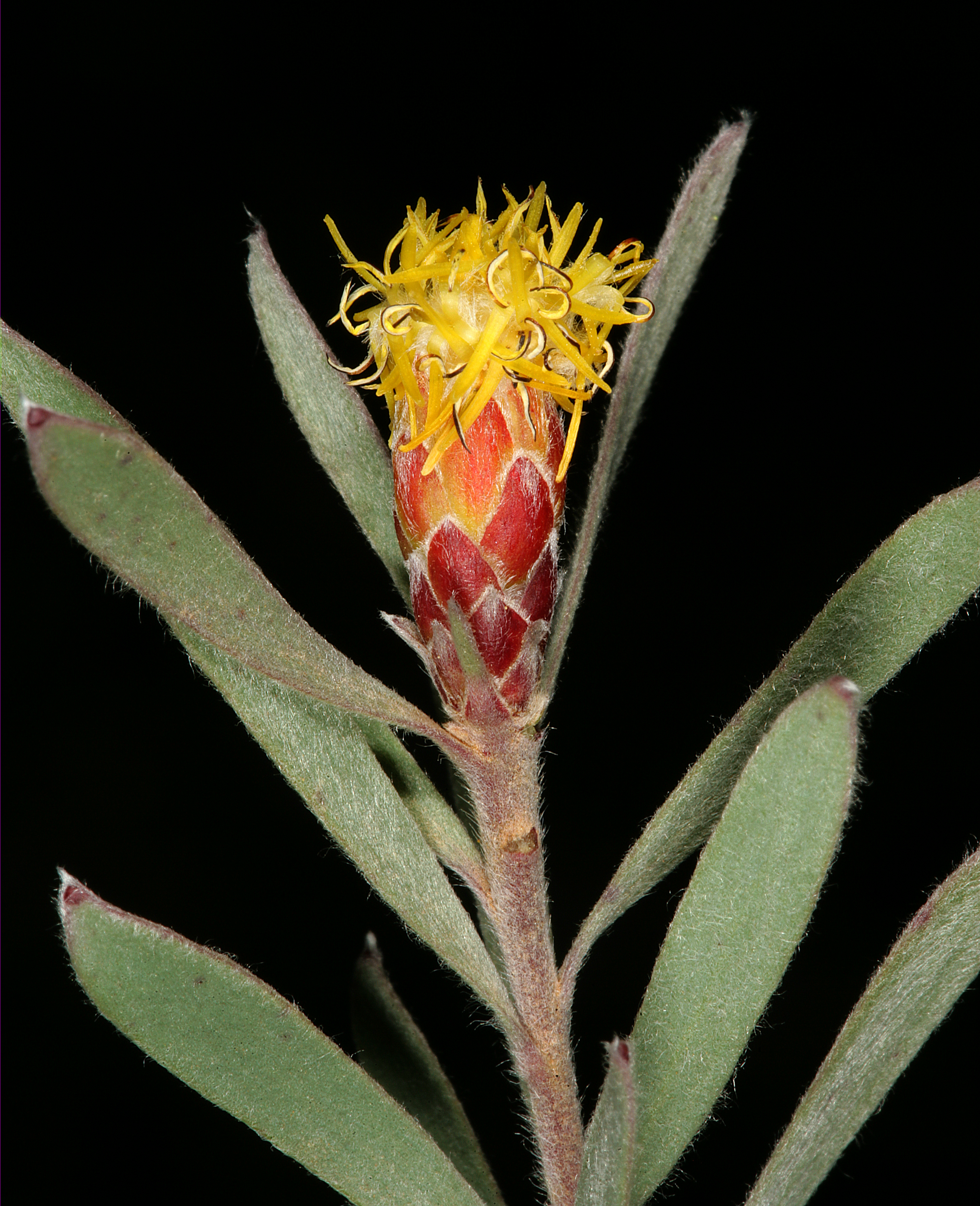

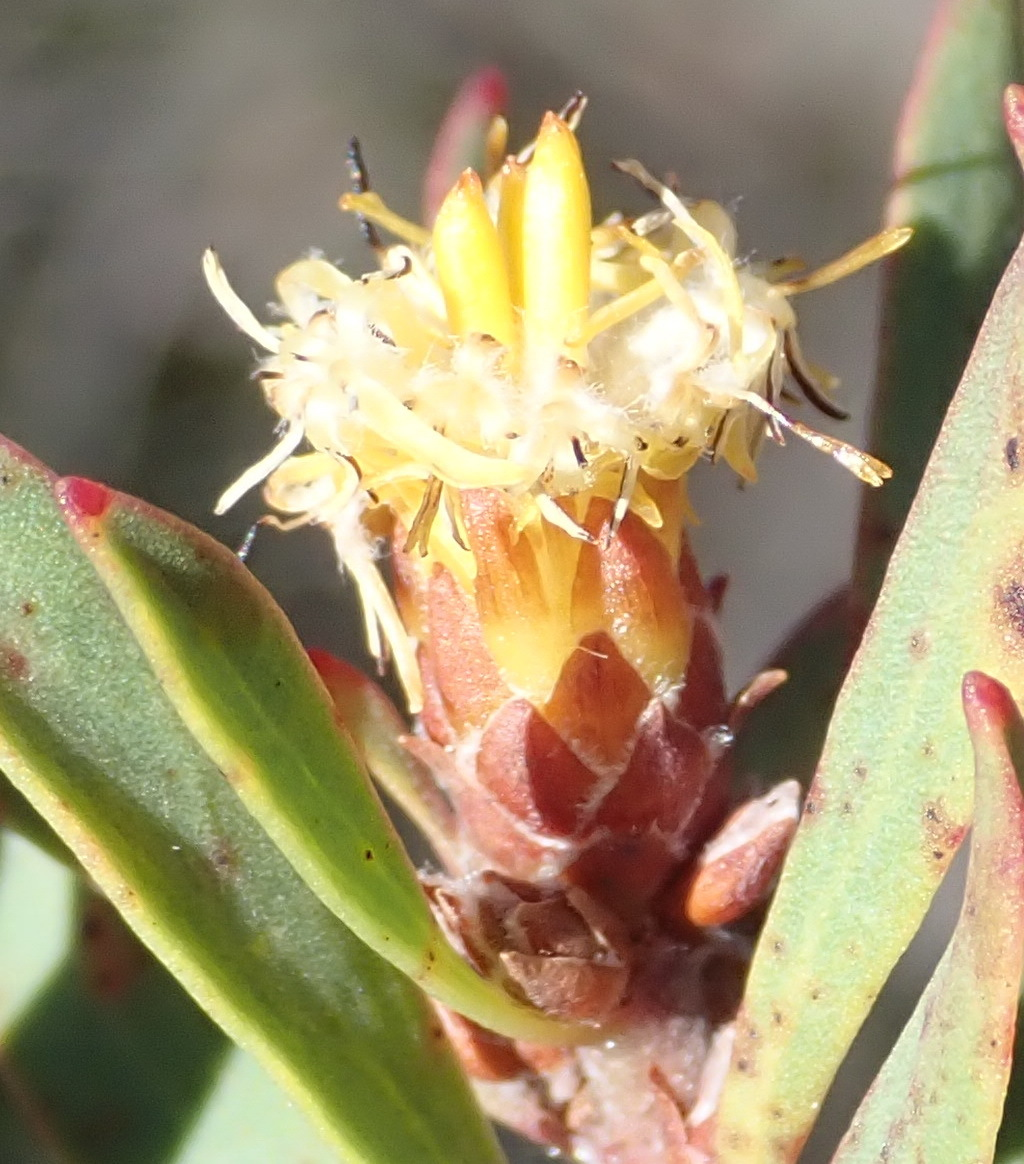
