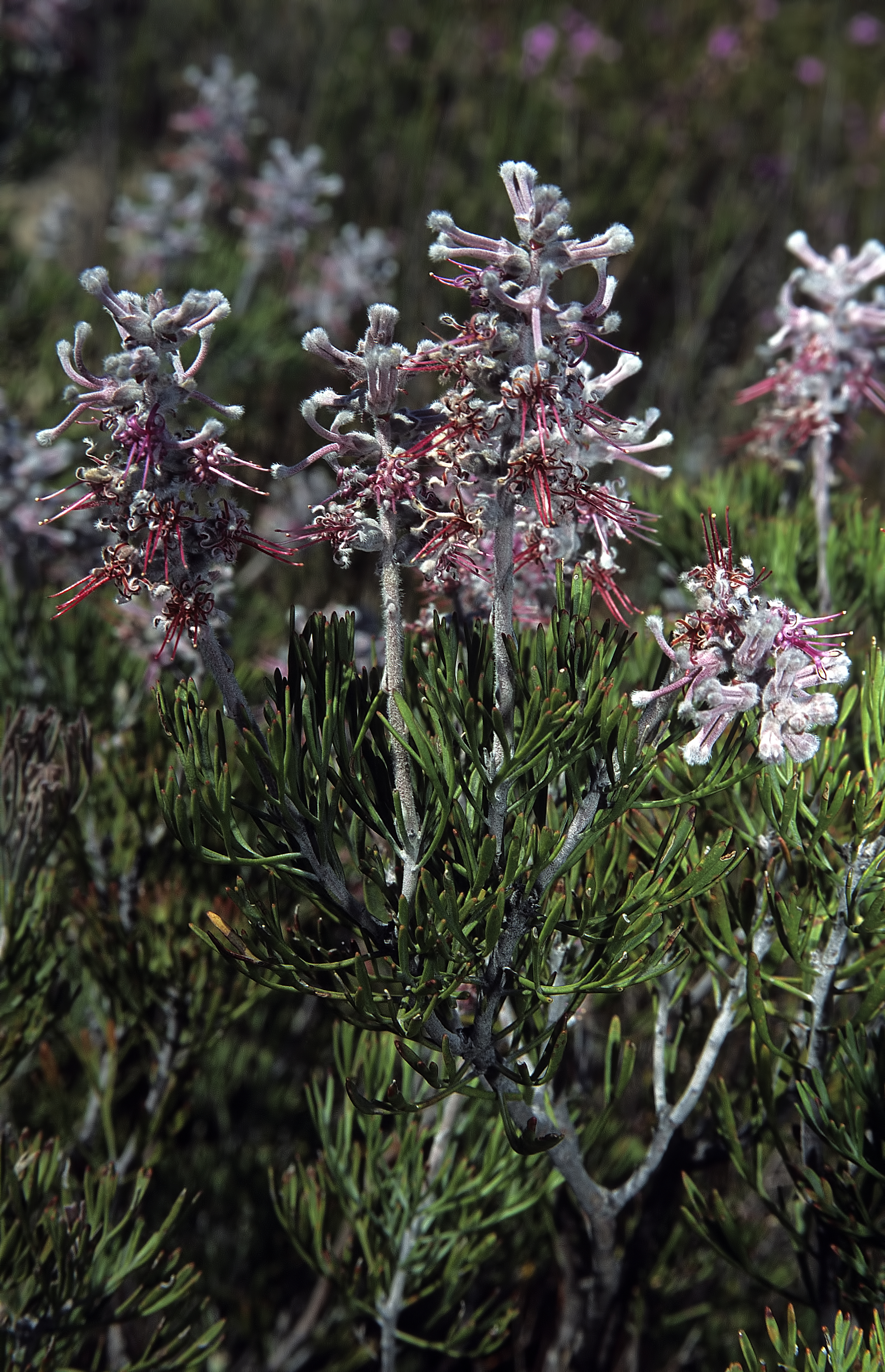

Conservation status
- Least Concern (IUCN 3.1)

Scientific classification
- Kingdom: Plantae
- Clade: Tracheophytes
- Clade: Angiosperms
- Clade: Eudicots
- Order: Proteales
- Family: Proteaceae
- Genus: Paranomus
- Species: P. dispersus

Binomial name
- Paranomus dispersus Levyns

= Paranomus dispersus =

Species of flowering plant

Paranomus dispersus, the long-head sceptre, is a flower-bearing shrub that belongs to the genus Paranomus and forms part of the fynbos. The plant is native to the Western Cape, South Africa.

== Description ==
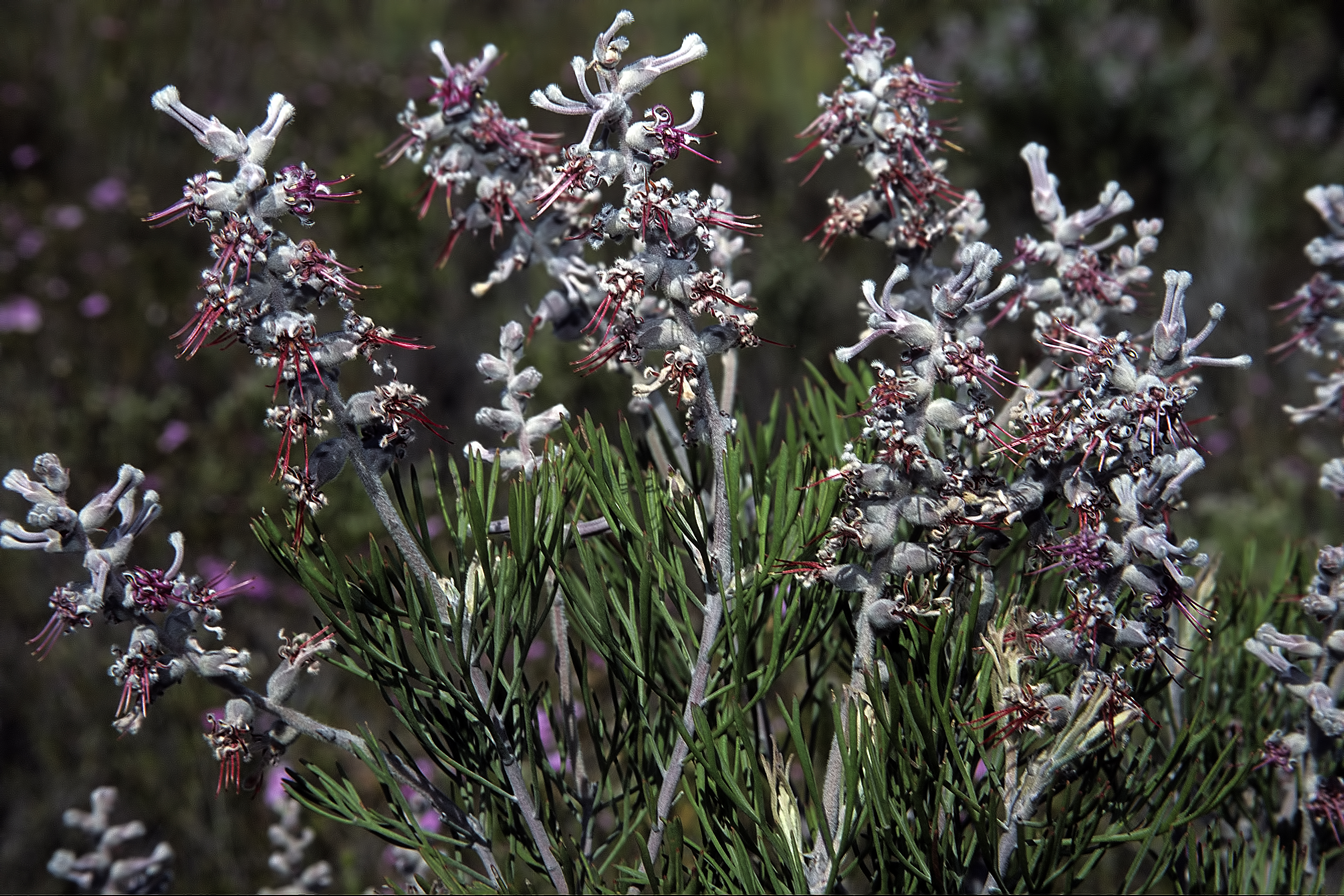

The shrub grows up to 1.5 m (4.9 ft) tall and flowers mainly from August to November. Fire destroys the plant but the seeds survive. The plant is bisexual and pollinated by insects. The fruit ripens, two months after flowering, and the seeds fall to the ground where they are spread by ants.

In Afrikaans, it is known as langkopsepter.

== Distribution and habitat ==
The plant occurs from the Great Winterhoek Mountains to the Riviersonderend Mountains to the Outeniqua Mountains and Swartberg and Rooiberg. It grows in sandstone sand at altitudes of 300–1,200 m (980–3,940 ft).

== Gallery ==
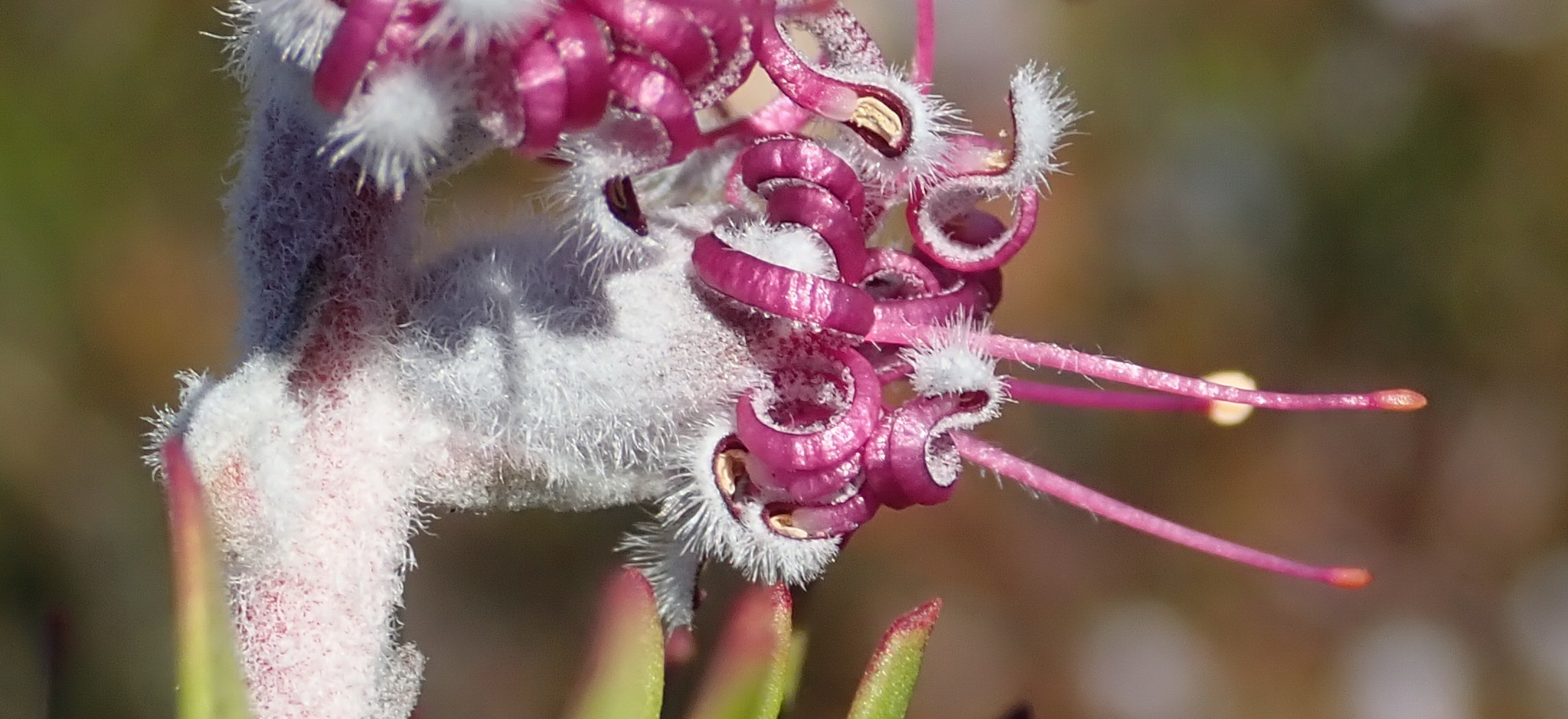

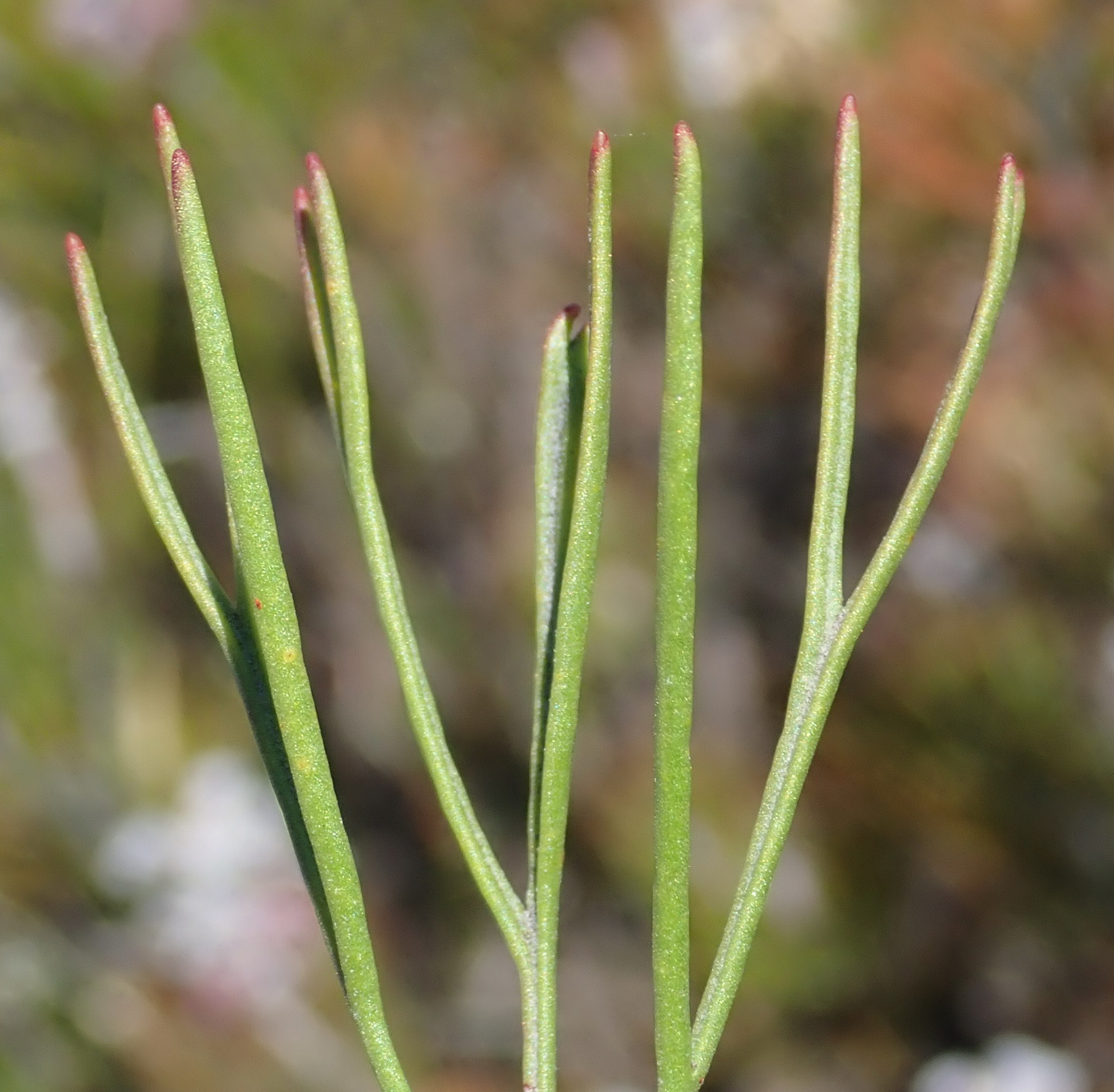

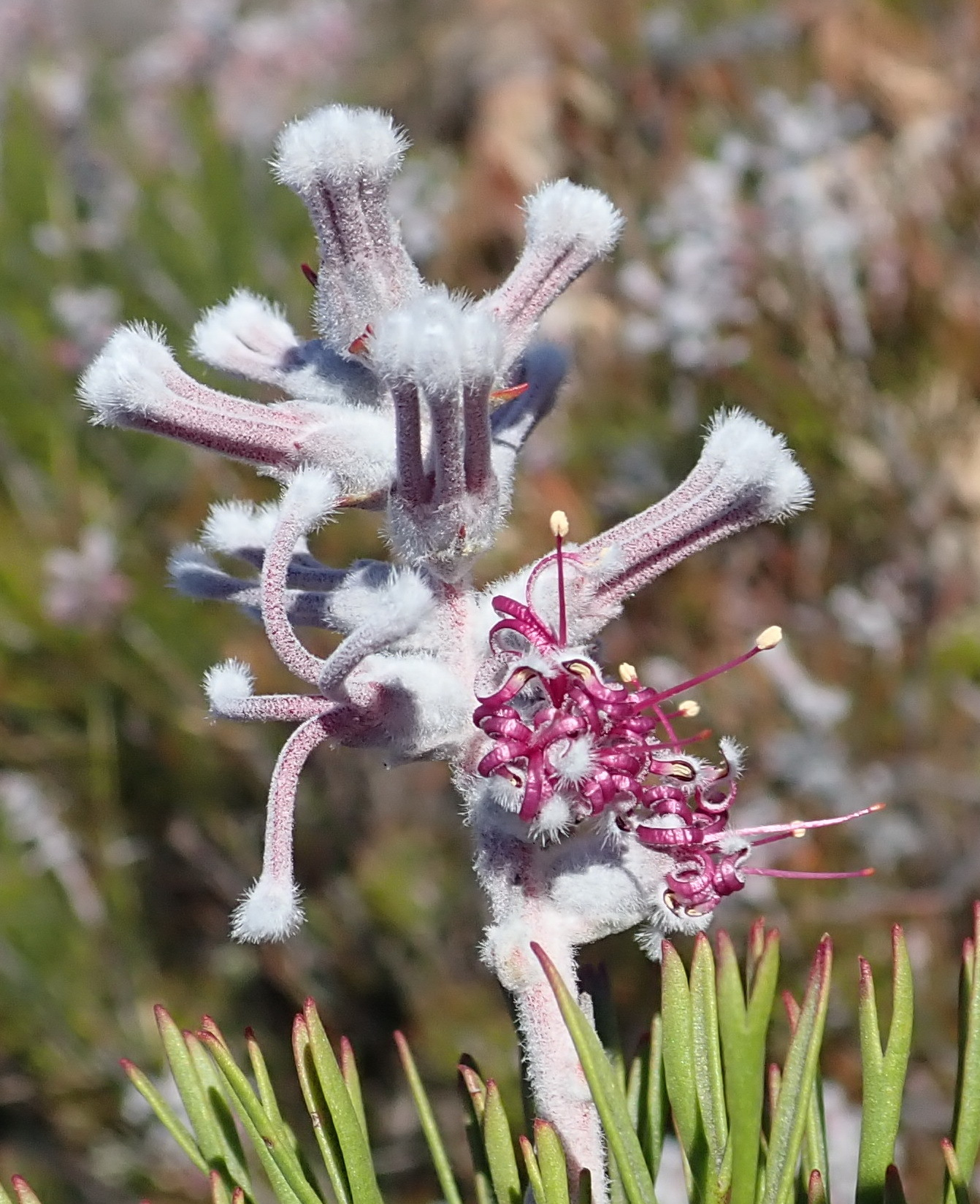

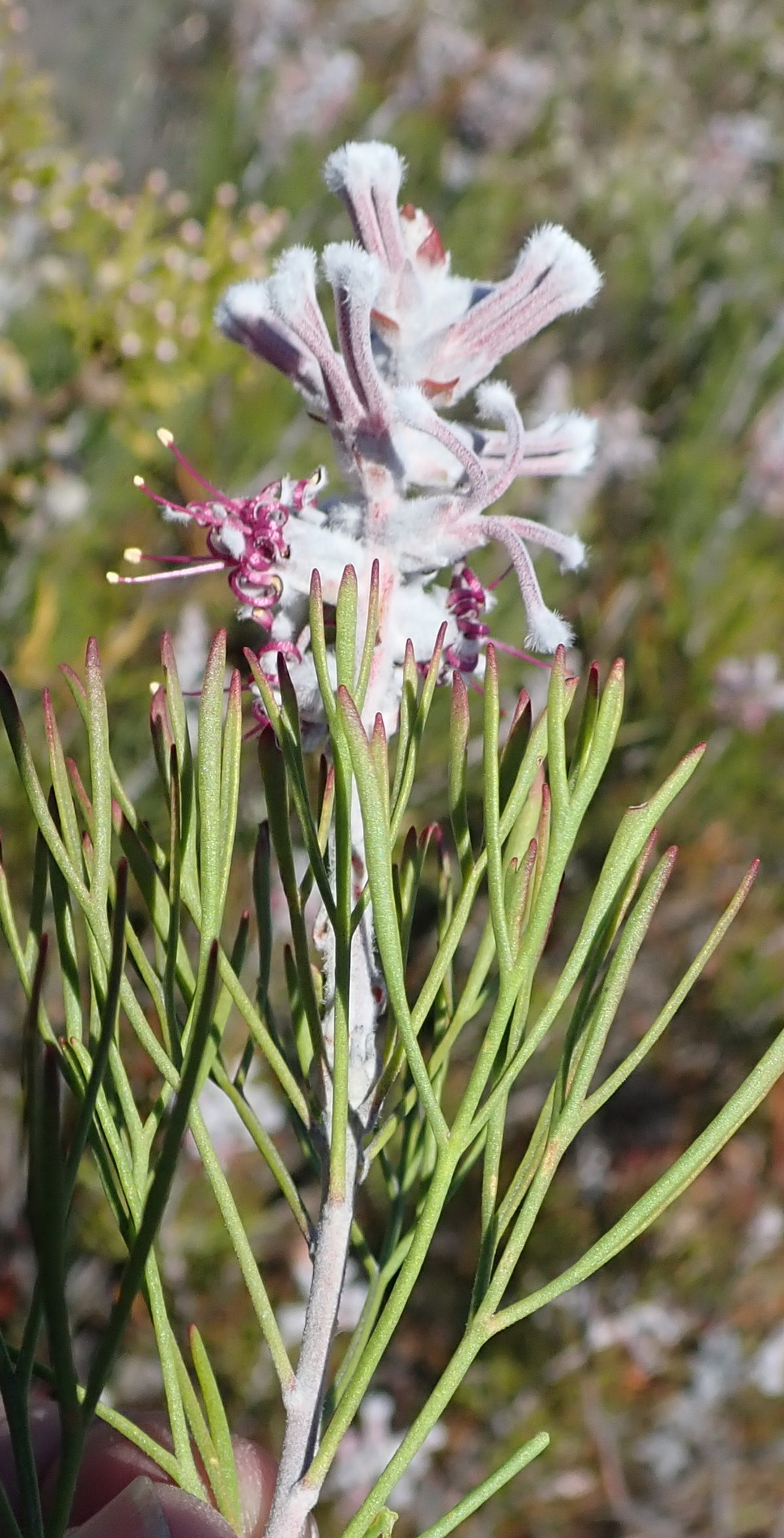

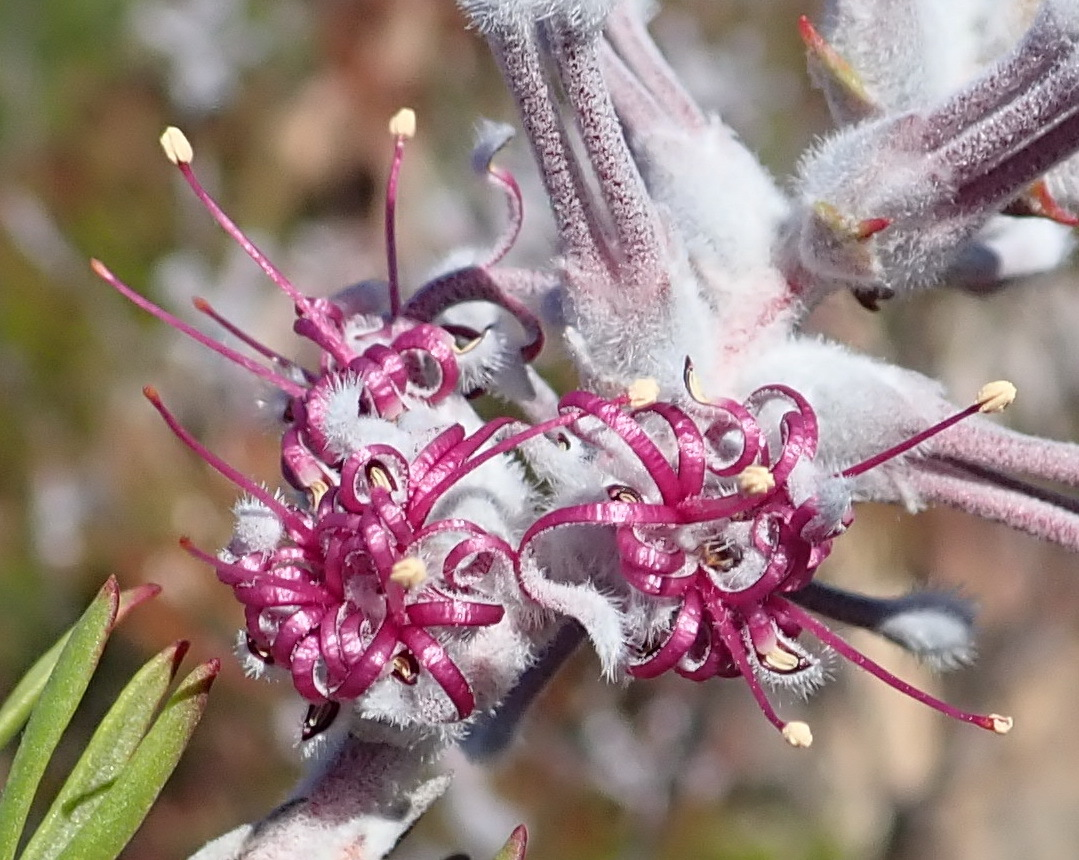

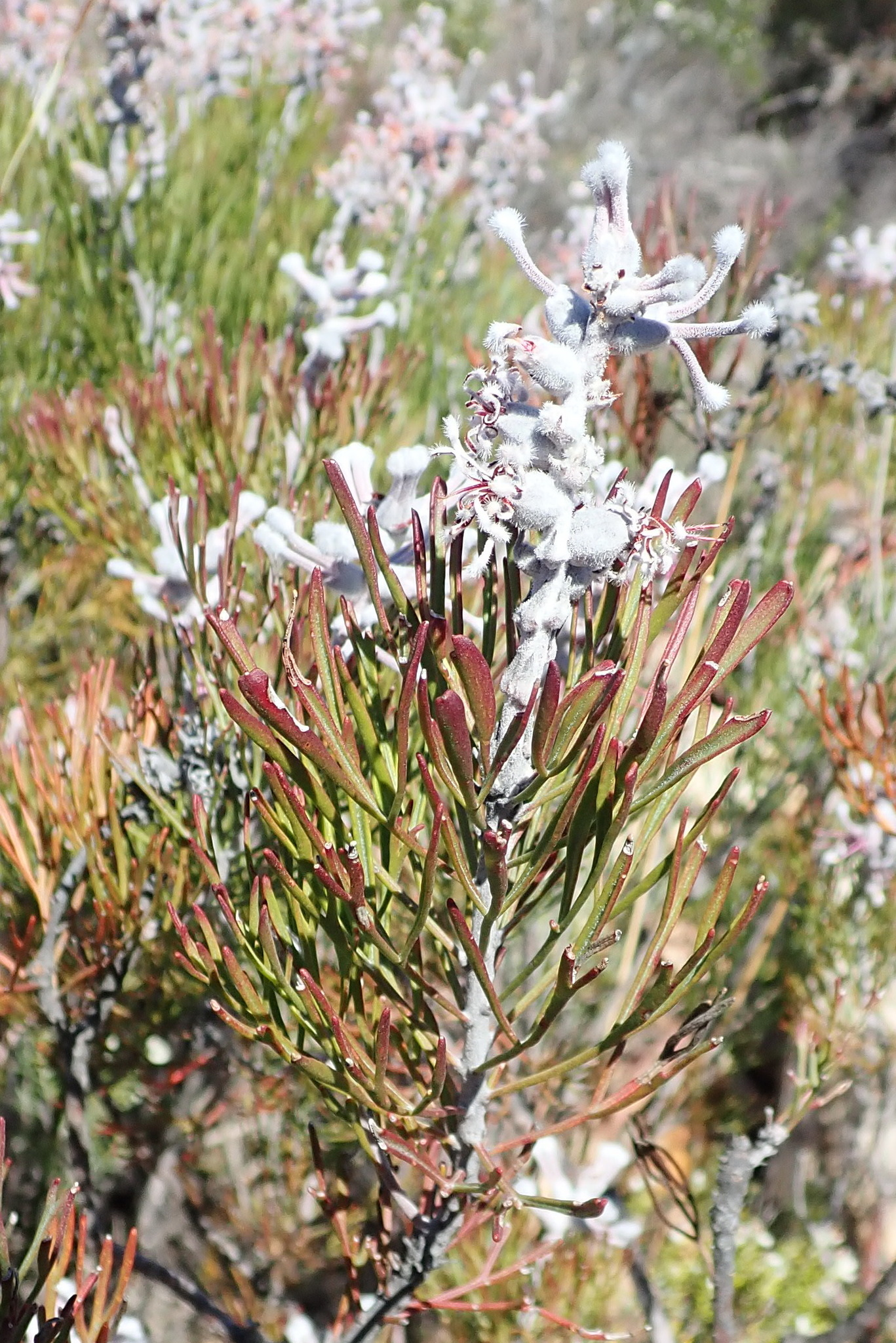

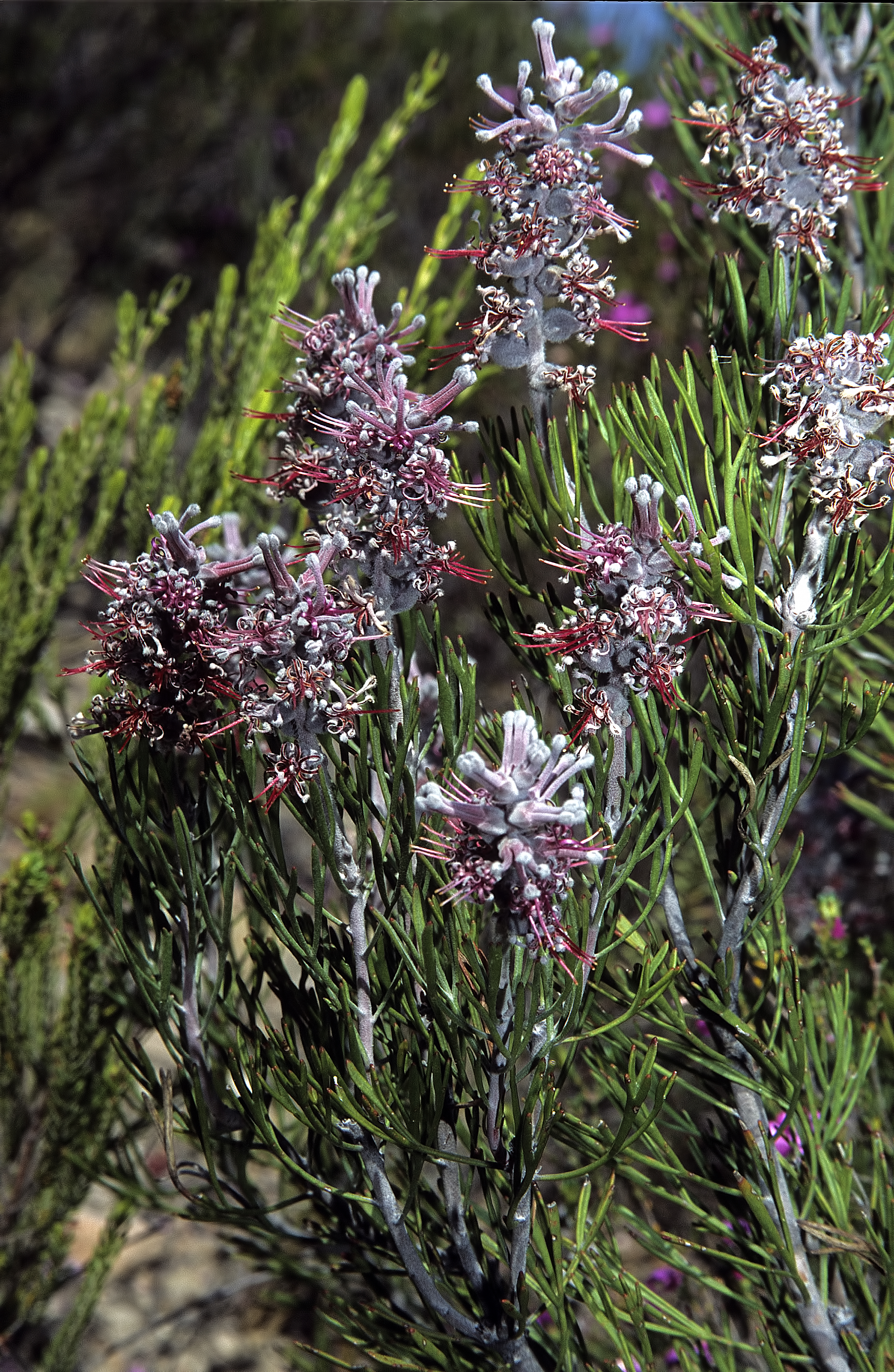

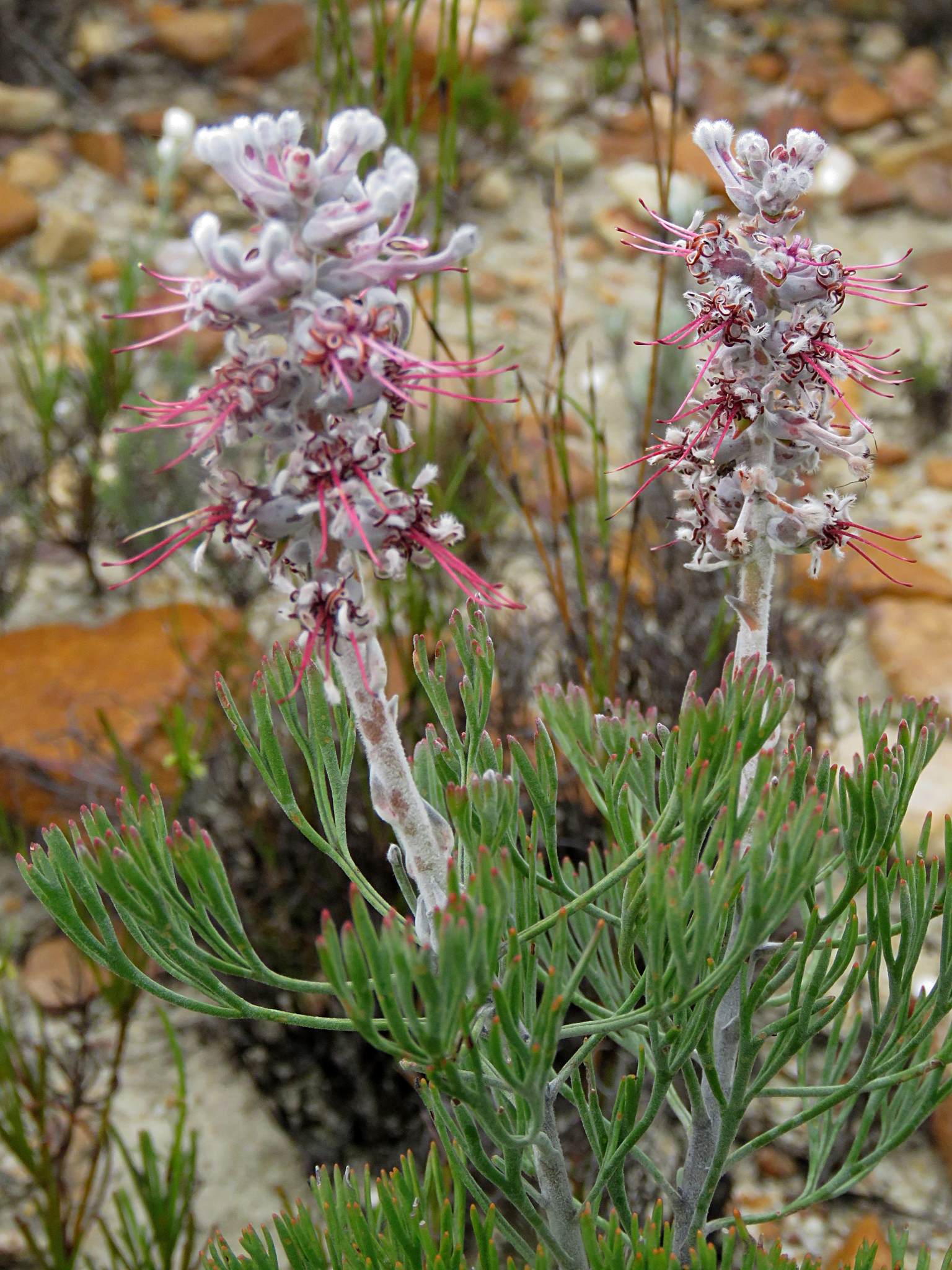

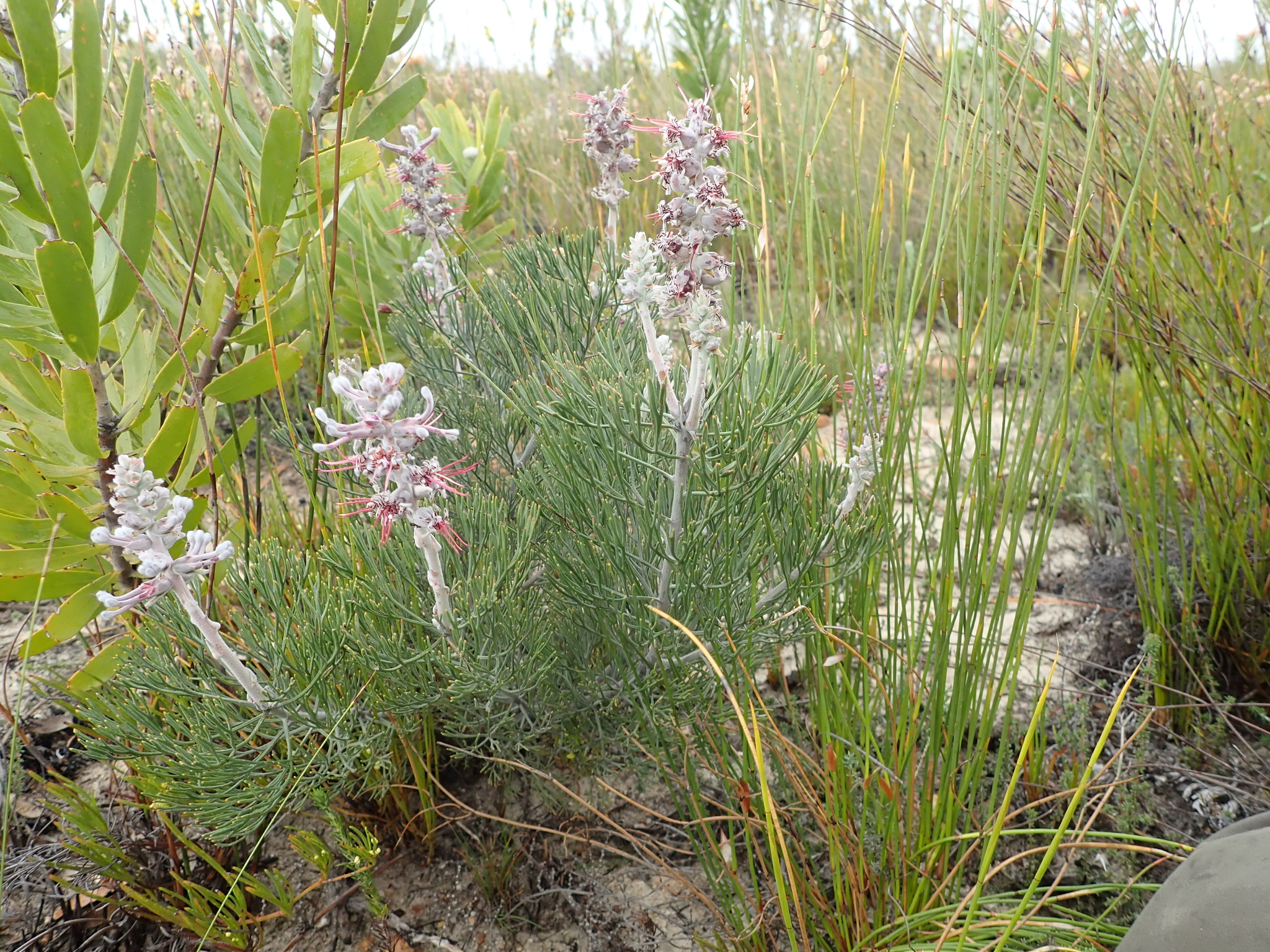

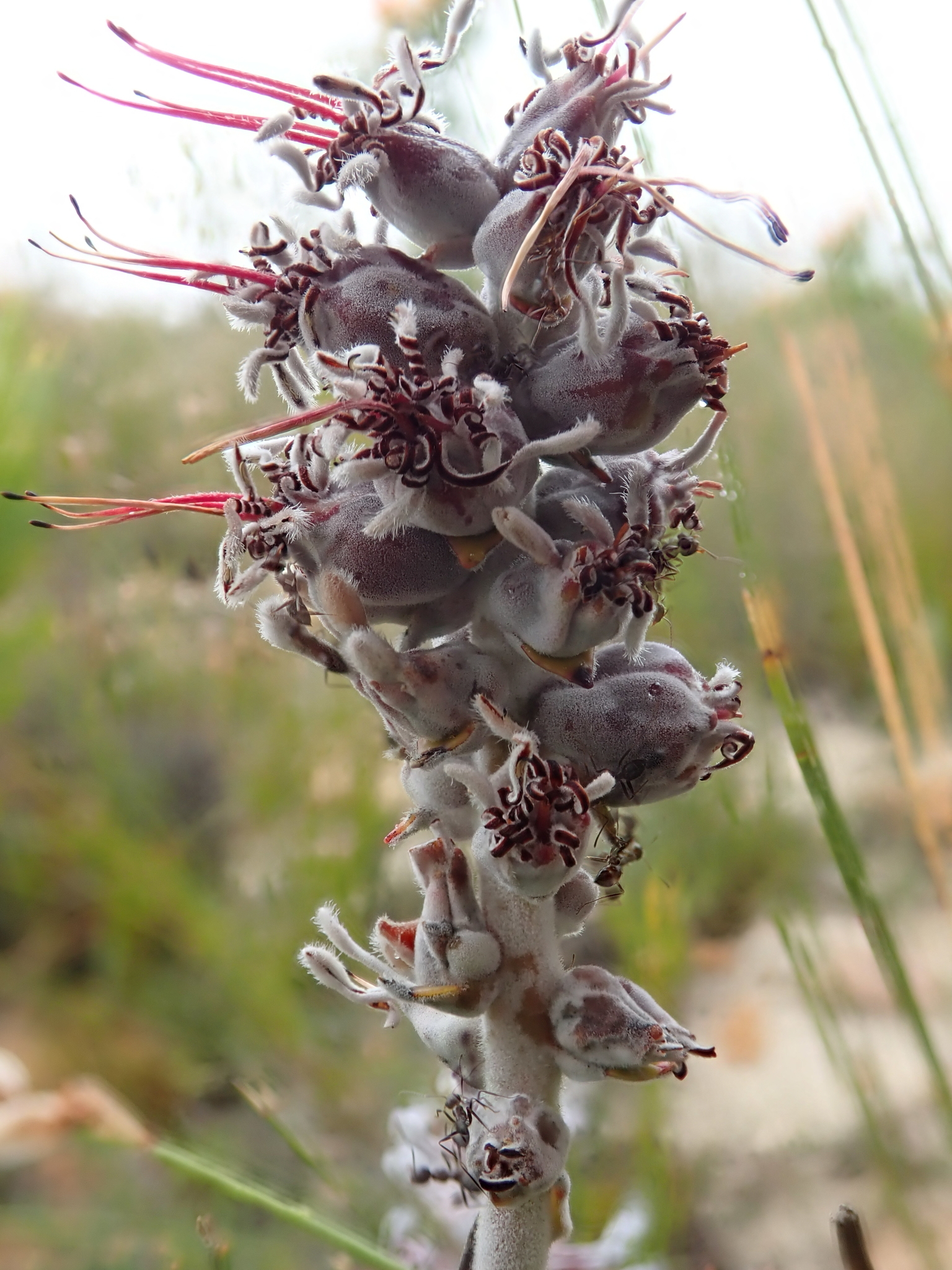

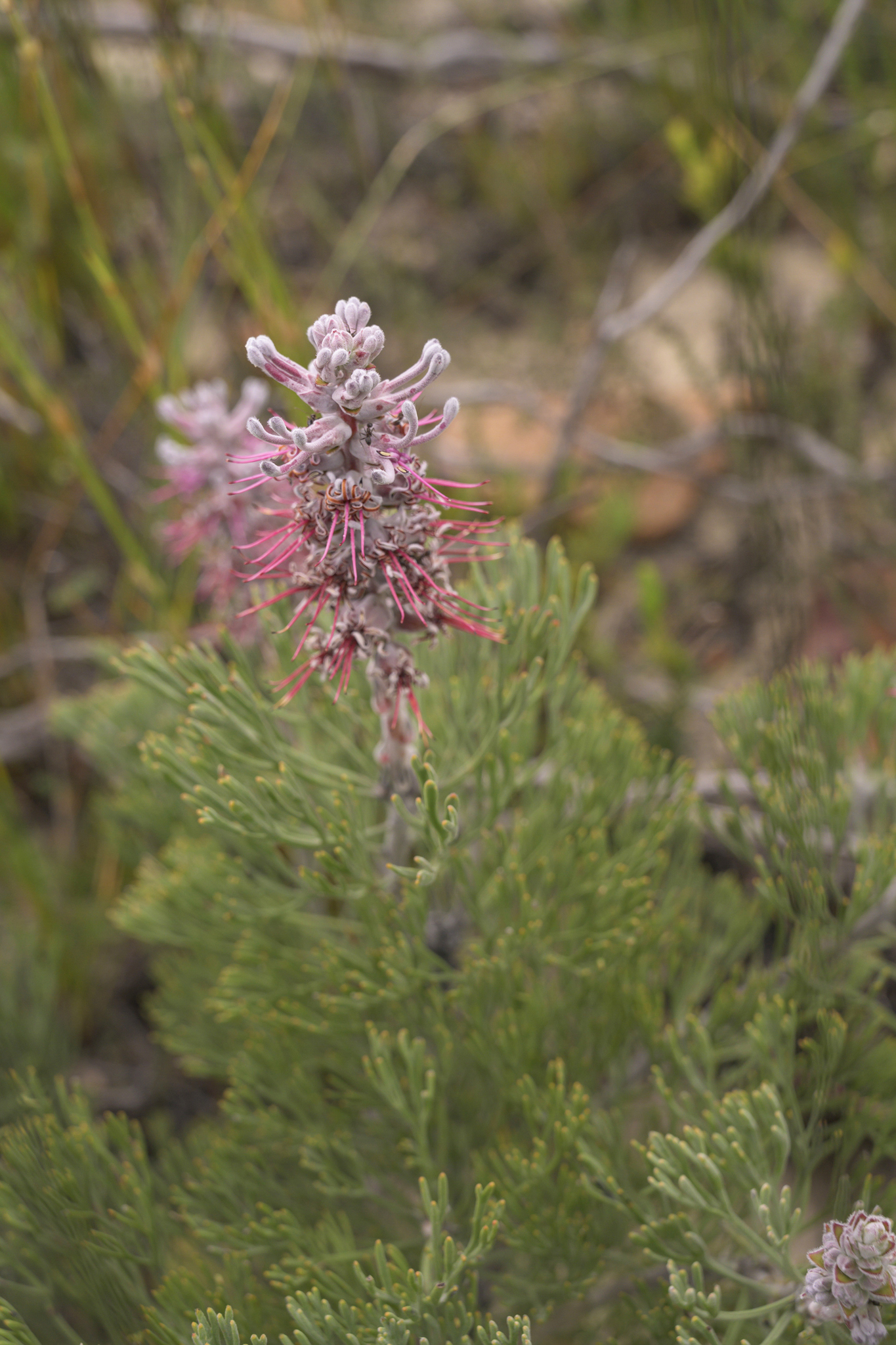

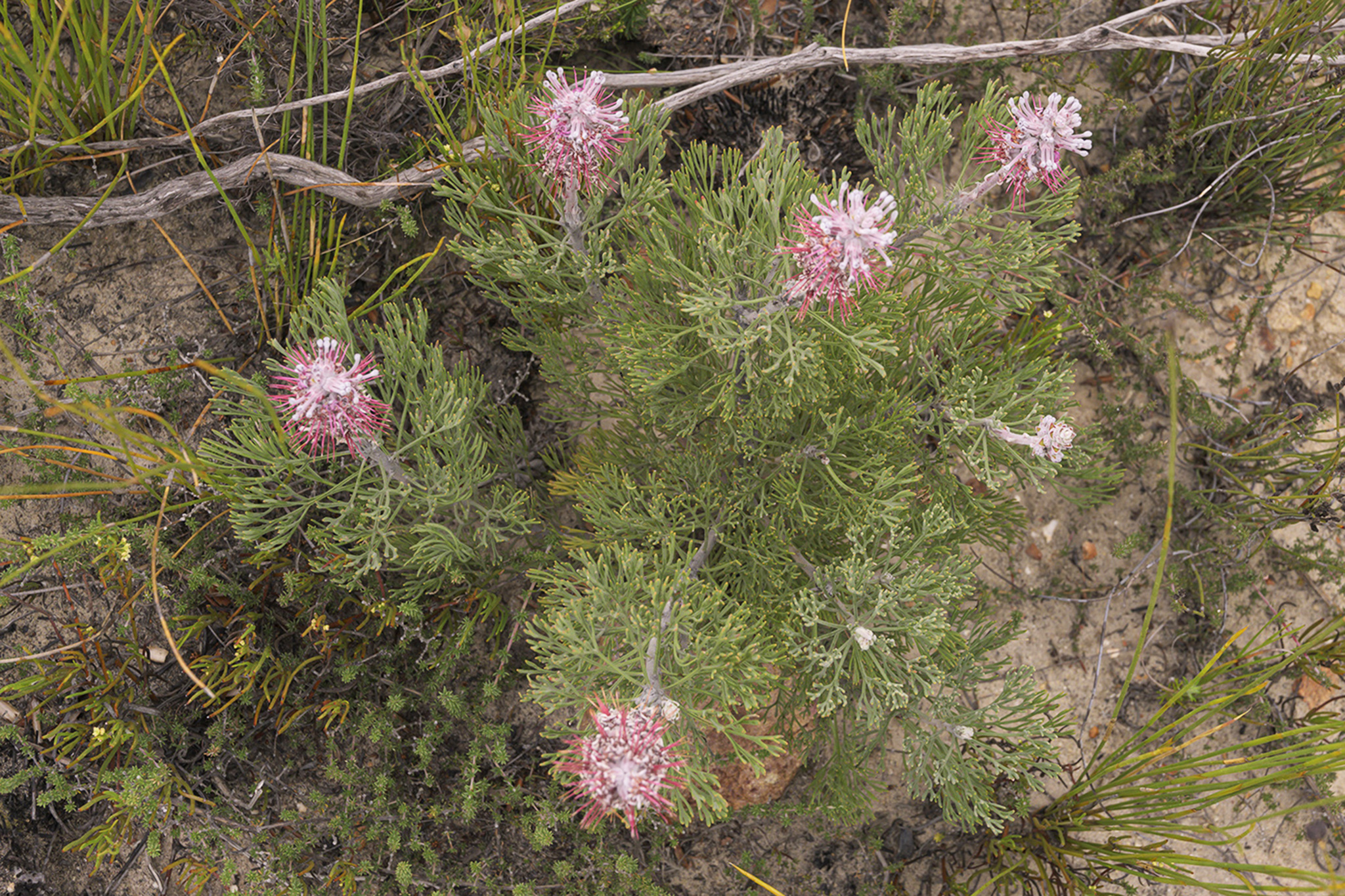
