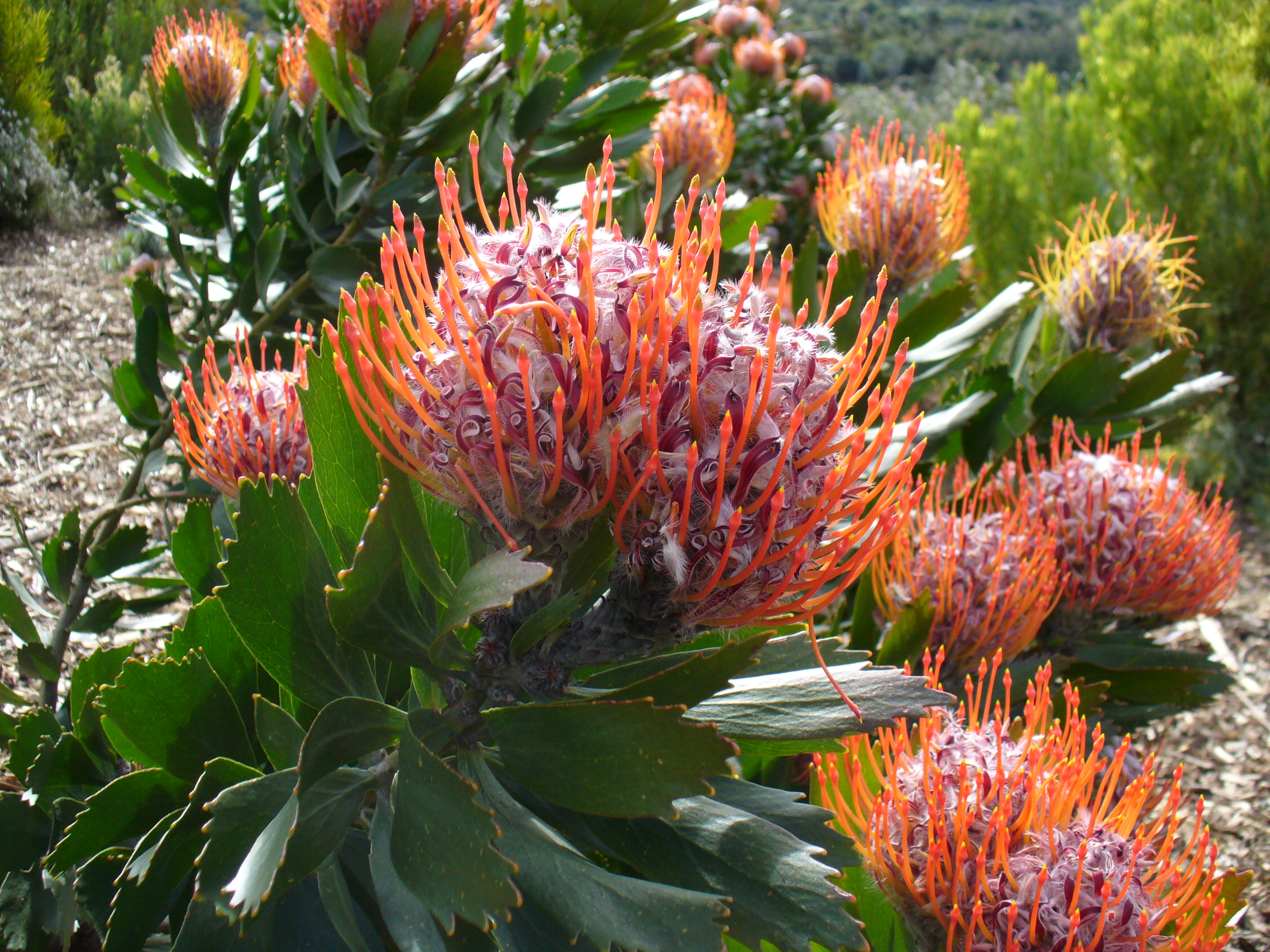

Conservation status
- Endangered (IUCN 3.1)

Scientific classification
- Kingdom: Plantae
- Clade: Embryophytes
- Clade: Tracheophytes
- Clade: Angiosperms
- Clade: Eudicots
- Order: Proteales
- Family: Proteaceae
- Genus: Leucospermum
- Species: L. glabrum

Binomial name
- Leucospermum glabrum Phillips, 1910

= Leucospermum glabrum =

Species of plant native to South Africa

Leucospermum glabrum is an evergreen, rounded, upright shrub of up to 2½ m (8 ft) high, that is assigned to the family Proteaceae. It has broad inverted egg-shaped leaves with seven to fourteen teeth near their tips, and oval flower heads of about 8 cm (3.2 in) in diameter, with hairy, orange and carmine-coloured flowers from which long styles with a thickened end emerge, giving the flowerhead as a whole the appearance of a pincushion. It flowers between August and October. Its common name is Outeniqua pincushion in English and Outeniekwa-kreupelhout in Afrikaans. It naturally occurs in a limited area on the south coast of South Africa.

== Description ==
L. glabrum is an upright, rounded shrub of up to 2½ m (8 ft) high, with a central stem at its foot of up to 10 cm (4 in) in diameter, with a reddish brown bark. Its flowering stems are woody and upright, ½–1 cm (0.2–0.4 in) in diameter, initially withsoft but clearly separated hairs which are soon lost. The leaves with a very short stalk, are slightly rising up, inverted egg-shaped to broadly so, wedge-shaped at its base, 8–12 cm (3.2–4.8 in) long and 3–5 cm (1.2–2.0 in) broad, hairless and bright green in colour, with seven to fourteen teeth near the tip.

The flower heads are oval in shape, 7–9 cm (2.8–3.6 in) in diameter, subsessile, usually on its own but sometimes grouped with two or three. The common base of the flowers in the same head is cone-shaped, about 4½ cm (1.8 in) long, and 1¼ cm (0.9 in) wide. The bracts subtending the common base are oval with a curved pointy tip, about 9 mm (0.35 in) long and 6 mm (0.24 in) wide, overlapping and tidily pressed against the surface, rubbery in consistency and softly hairy.

The bracts subtending each individually flower, envelops it at its base, is about 1½ cm (0.6 in) long and 1 cm (0.4 in) wide, with a strongly recurved pointed tip ending in a short thread, and the margins with a regular row of equal hairs, the outside deep carmine in colour in life, rubbery in consistency, densely woolly at base and softly hairy towards the tip. The perianth is about 3½ cm (1.4 in) long, carmine to bright orange in colour. The lower part with the lobes fused (called tube) is about 1 cm (0.4 in) long and lacks hair. The middle part where at least one of the lobes becomes free when the flower opens (called claws), is bright crimson inside the outside of the lobe facing the rim of the head sparsely felty hairy, the outer three densely covered in cringed adpressed hairs. The higher part of the lobes (called limbs) is narrowly elliptic in shape with a pointy tip, variably covered with long soft hairs. The style is stout, 5–6 cm (2.0–2.4 in) long and 2–3 mm (0.08–0.12 in) in diameter, when fully developed slightly curved towards the center of the head. The slightly thickened part at the tip of the style that hovered up the pollen while in the bud called pollen presenter is conical in shape with a pointy tip, about 6 mm (0.24 in) long and half as wide, with a groove that acts as the stigma at the very tip. The ovary is subtended by four triangular, ivory to cream coloured scales of about 1½ mm (0.06 in) long.

=== Differences with other pincushions ===
L. glabrum differs from other pincushions because of its large inverted egg-shaped, bright green, hairless leaves of 8–12 cm (3.2–4.8 in) long and 3–5 cm (1.2–2.0 in) wide, with seven to fourteen teeth near the tip, the stems hairless when matured and the bracts subtending the common base of the flowers in one head with pointy and recurved tips.

== Taxonomy ==
The Outeniqua pincushion was first recognised as a separate species and described by Edwin Percy Phillips in 1910, but the type specimen was already collected in 1814 by English explorer and naturalist William John Burchell. Leucospermum glabrum is assigned to the tree pincushions, section Conocarpodendron.

The name of the species glabrum is Latin and means "hairless", a reference to the lack of hair on the leaves.

== Distribution, habitat and ecology ==
The Outeniqua pincushion occurs here and there between the Cradockberg near George and Prince Alfred's Pass near Plettenberg Bay in the southern foothills of the Outeniqua Mountains. It only grows on south-facing, sheltered, cool slopes between of 150–450 m (500–1500 ft) altitude, where it experiences an annual precipitation of 750–1000 mm (30–40 in) more or less evenly distributed over the year. Plants are found in fynbos on moist peat soils between other very tall shrubs such as Laurophyllus capensis, several species of Leucadendron, Berzelia and Erica, forming a dense vegetation called "hygrophilous macchia".

== Conservation ==
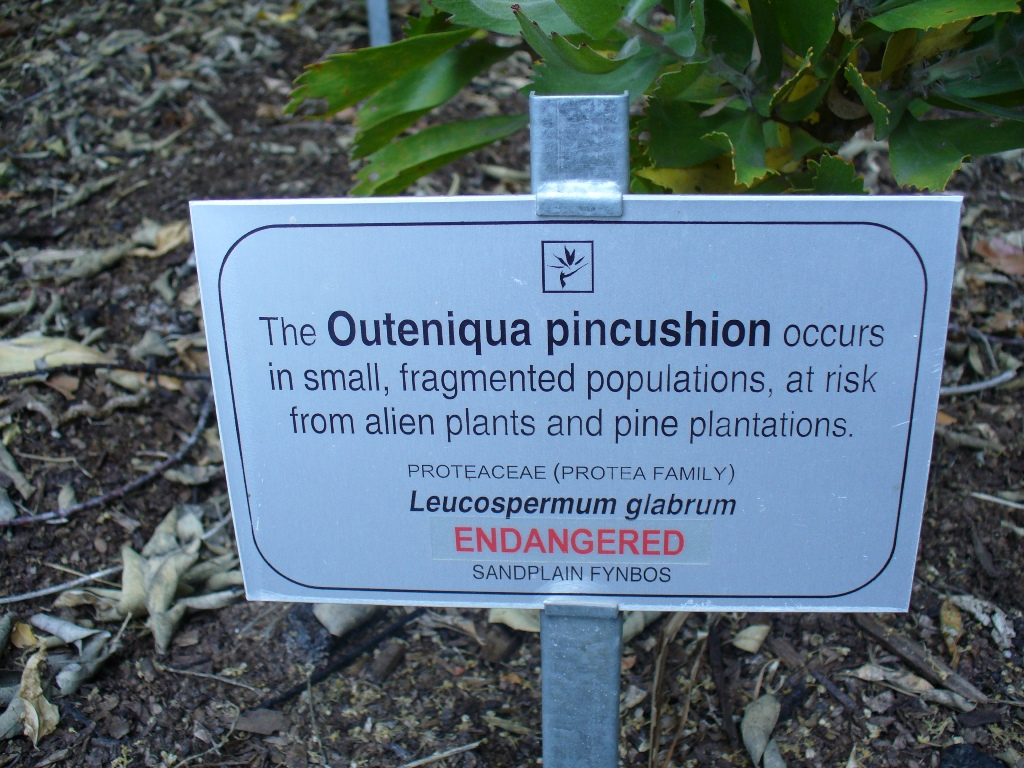
Information tag in Kirstenbosch National Botanical Garden

The Outeniqua pincushion is considered an endangered species because there are only fourteen subpopulations. The total population size is falling due to invasive plant species, conversion to forest and the maintenance of fire breaks. Subpopulations strongly fluctuate in size because of wildfires. The total size of the population is below a thousand mature plants. New stands of this species may develop from the underground soil seed bank after a fire and subsequent rains.
