= Rooiberg =

- Location within Limpopo Location within South Africa
- Coordinates: 24.776°S 27.738°E
- Country: South Africa
- Province: Limpopo
- District: Waterberg
- Municipality: Thabazimbi

Area
  - Total: 43.98 km^{2} (16.98 sq mi)

Population (2011)
  - Total: 2,310
  - Density: 52.5/km^{2} (136/sq mi)

Racial makeup (2011)
  - Black African: 88.4%
  - Coloured: 0.4%
  - Indian/Asian: 0.2%
  - White: 10.8%
  - Other: 0.2%

First languages (2011)
  - Tswana: 65.1%
  - Afrikaans: 10.3%
  - Northern Sotho: 9.0%
  - Tsonga: 4.5%
  - Other: 11.0%
- Time zone: UTC+2 (SAST)
- PO box: 0500
- Area code: 014

Rooiberg is a town in Waterberg District Municipality in the Limpopo province of South Africa.

Town, archaeological site and tin-mining area, 50 km (31 mi) west-north-west of Warmbad, at the conjunction of the Springbok Flats with the Waterberg Plateau. The name is Afrikaans for "red mountain".
