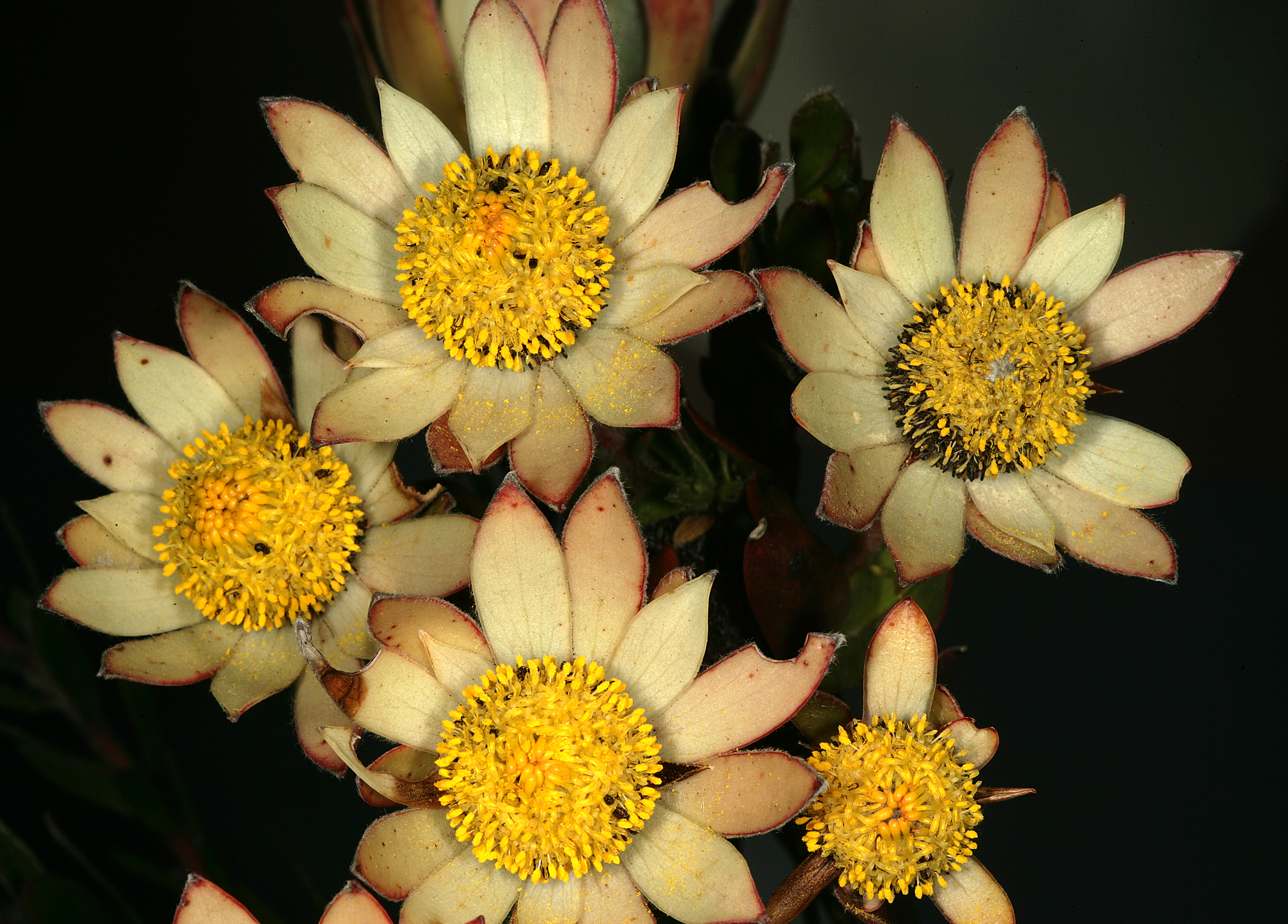

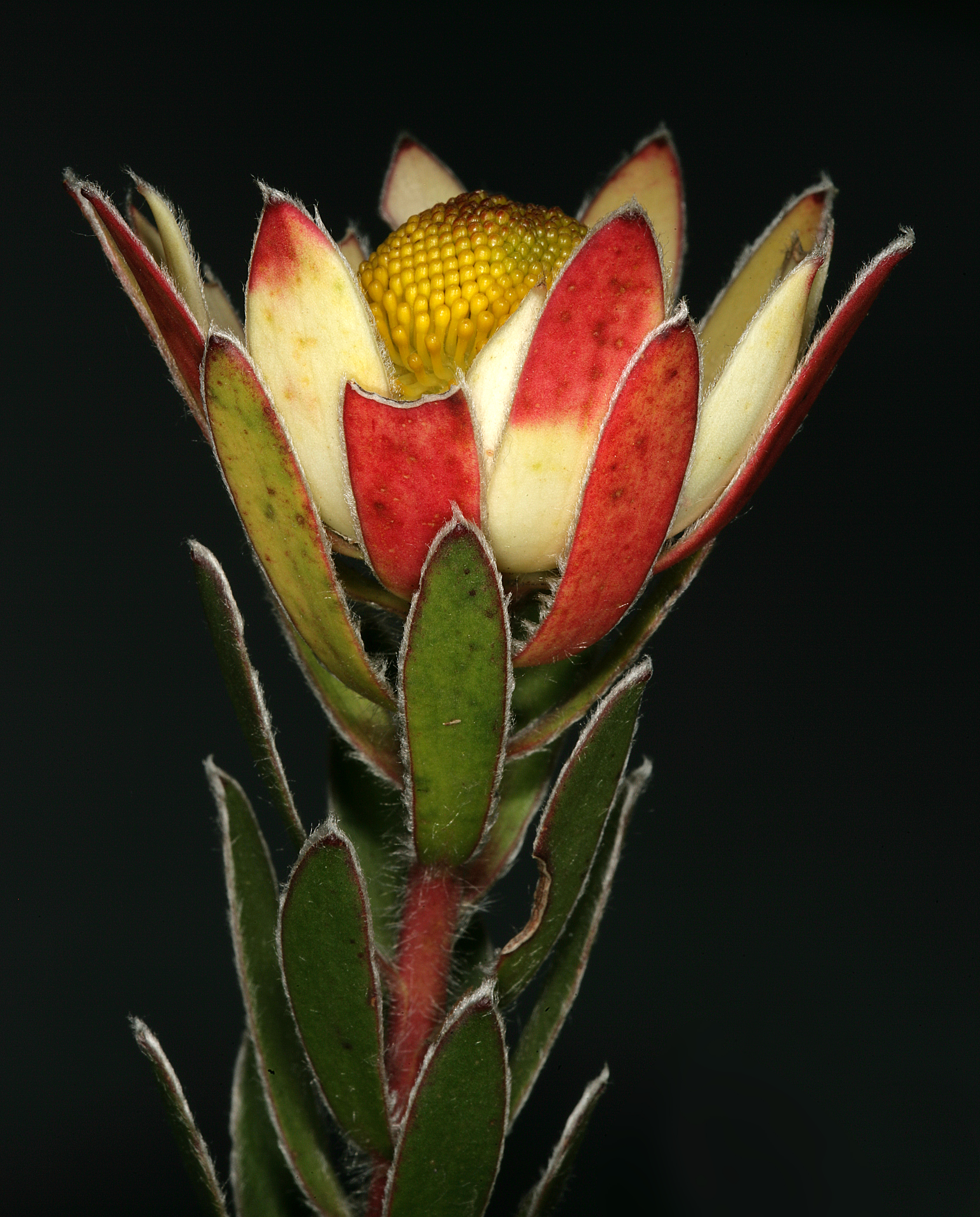

Conservation status
- Least Concern (IUCN 3.1)

Scientific classification
- Kingdom: Plantae
- Clade: Tracheophytes
- Clade: Angiosperms
- Clade: Eudicots
- Order: Proteales
- Family: Proteaceae
- Genus: Leucadendron
- Species: L. spissifolium (Salisb. ex Knight) I.Williams
- Subspecies: L. s. subsp. spissifolium

Trinomial name
- Leucadendron spissifolium subsp. spissifolium

= Leucadendron spissifolium subsp. spissifolium =

Subspecies of plant

Leucadendron spissifolium subsp. spissifolium, the common spear-leaf conebush, is a flower-bearing shrub belonging to the genus Leucadendron and forms part of the fynbos. The plant is native to the Western Cape where it occurs on the Gifberg and from the Cederberg to the Cape Peninsula and Kogelberg to Kampscheberg in the Langeberg.

The shrub grows to 1.3 m tall and sprouts again after a fire. The shrub blooms from September to October, there are separate plants with male and female flowers (unisexual), which are pollinated by small beetles. The seeds are stored in a toll on the female plant and only fall to the ground after a fire. The seeds have wings and are spread by the wind. The plant grows mainly on southern slopes in moist sandstone soil at altitudes of 0 – 1500 m.
