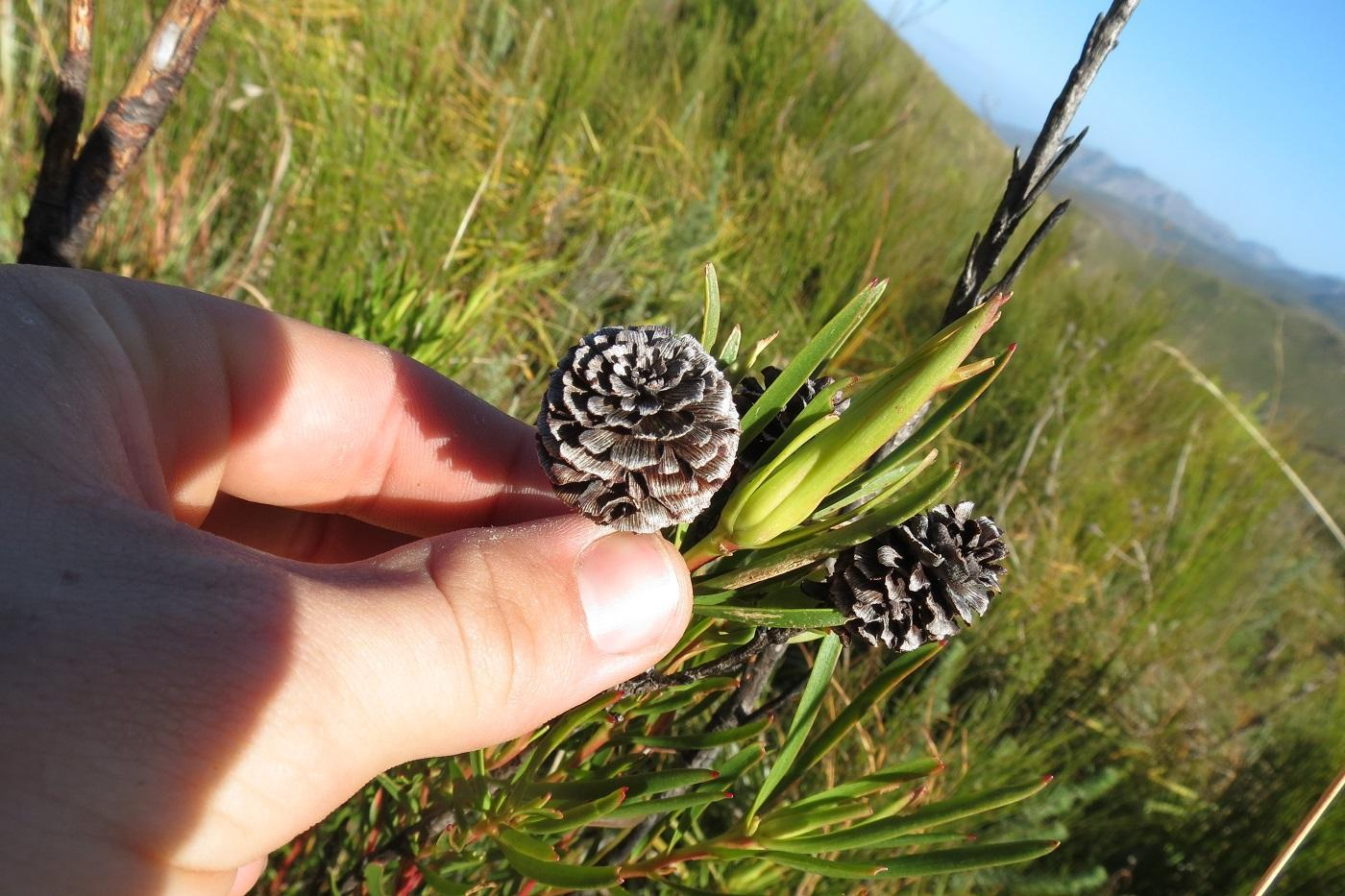

Conservation status
- Near Threatened (IUCN 3.1)

Scientific classification
- Kingdom: Plantae
- Clade: Tracheophytes
- Clade: Angiosperms
- Clade: Eudicots
- Order: Proteales
- Family: Proteaceae
- Genus: Leucadendron
- Species: L. spissifolium
- Subspecies: L. s. subsp. phillipsii

Trinomial name
- Leucadendron spissifolium subsp. phillipsii (Hutch.) I.Williams

= Leucadendron spissifolium subsp. phillipsii =

Subspecies of plant

Leucadendron spissifolium subsp. phillipsii, the Kareedouwvlakte spear-leaf conebush, is a flower-bearing shrub belonging to the genus Leucadendron and forms part of the fynbos. The plant is native to the Eastern Cape and Western Cape, South Africa.

== Description ==
The shrub sprouts again after a fire. The seeds are stored in a toll on the female plant, first fall to the ground after a fire and are spread by the wind. The plant is unisexual and there are separate plants with male and female flowers, which are pollinated by insects. It can be distinguished from other subspecies by its ovate involucral bracts.

== Distribution and habitat ==
The plant occurs in the Tsitsikamma Mountains, Elandsberg, and Vanstadensberg. It grows mainly in moist, southern slopes at altitudes of 30–500 m (98–1,640 ft).

== Gallery ==
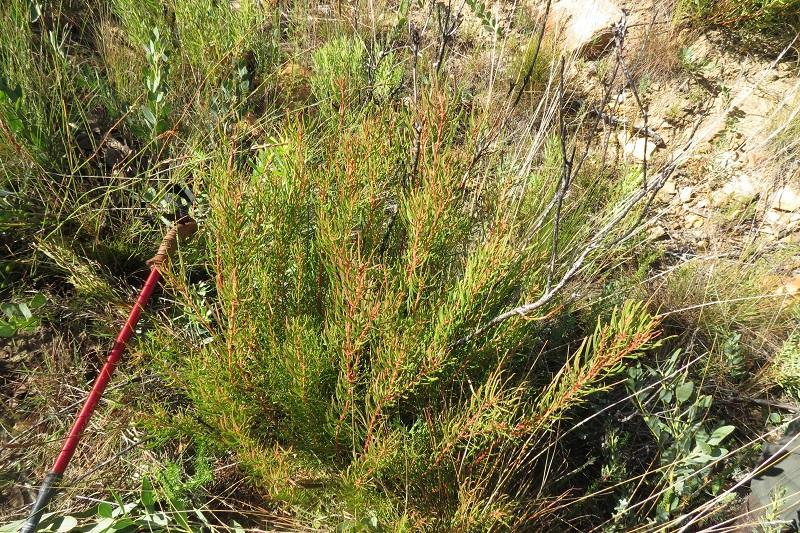

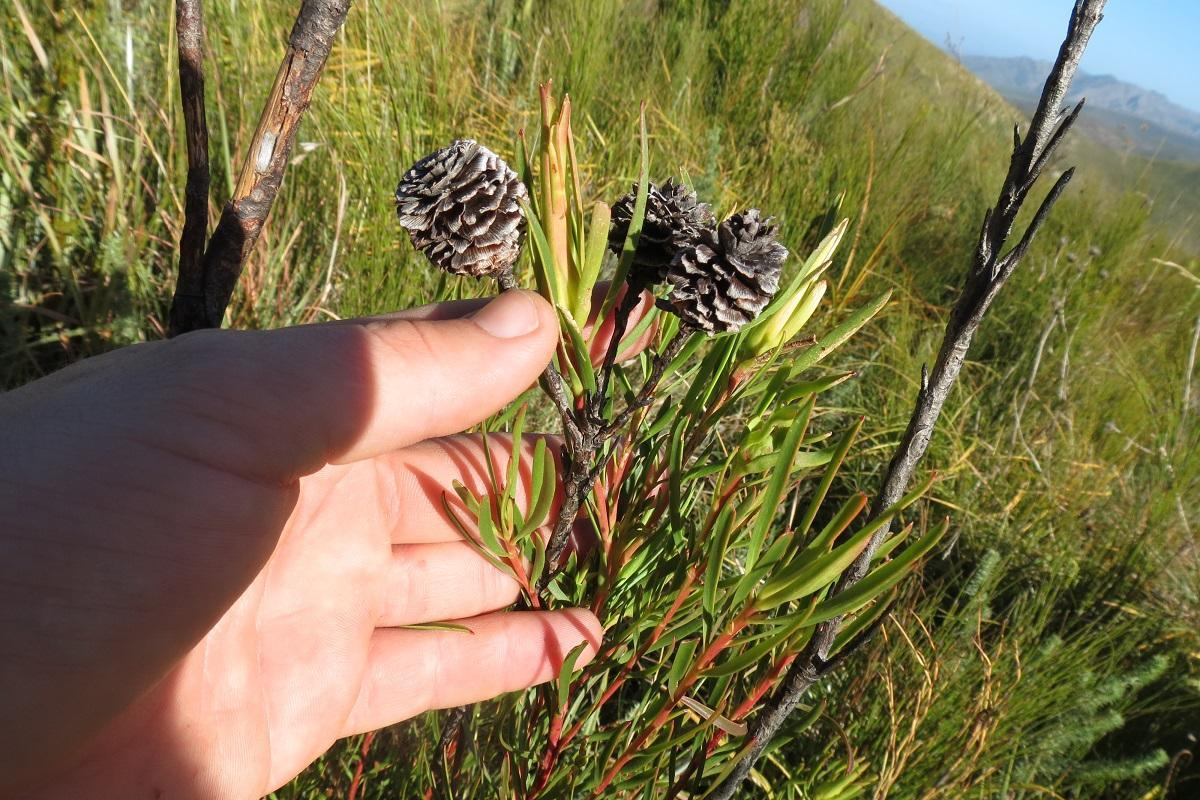
