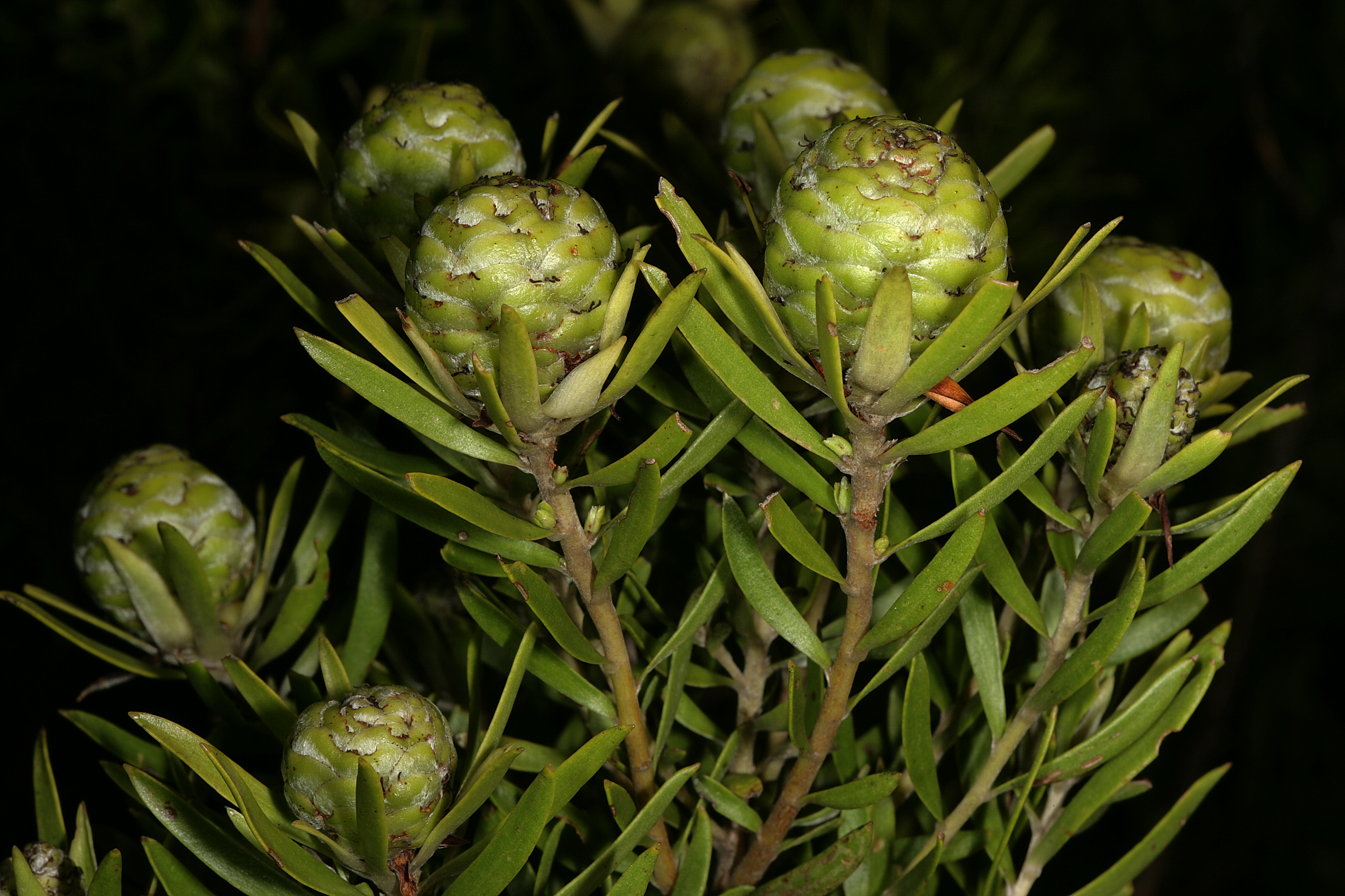

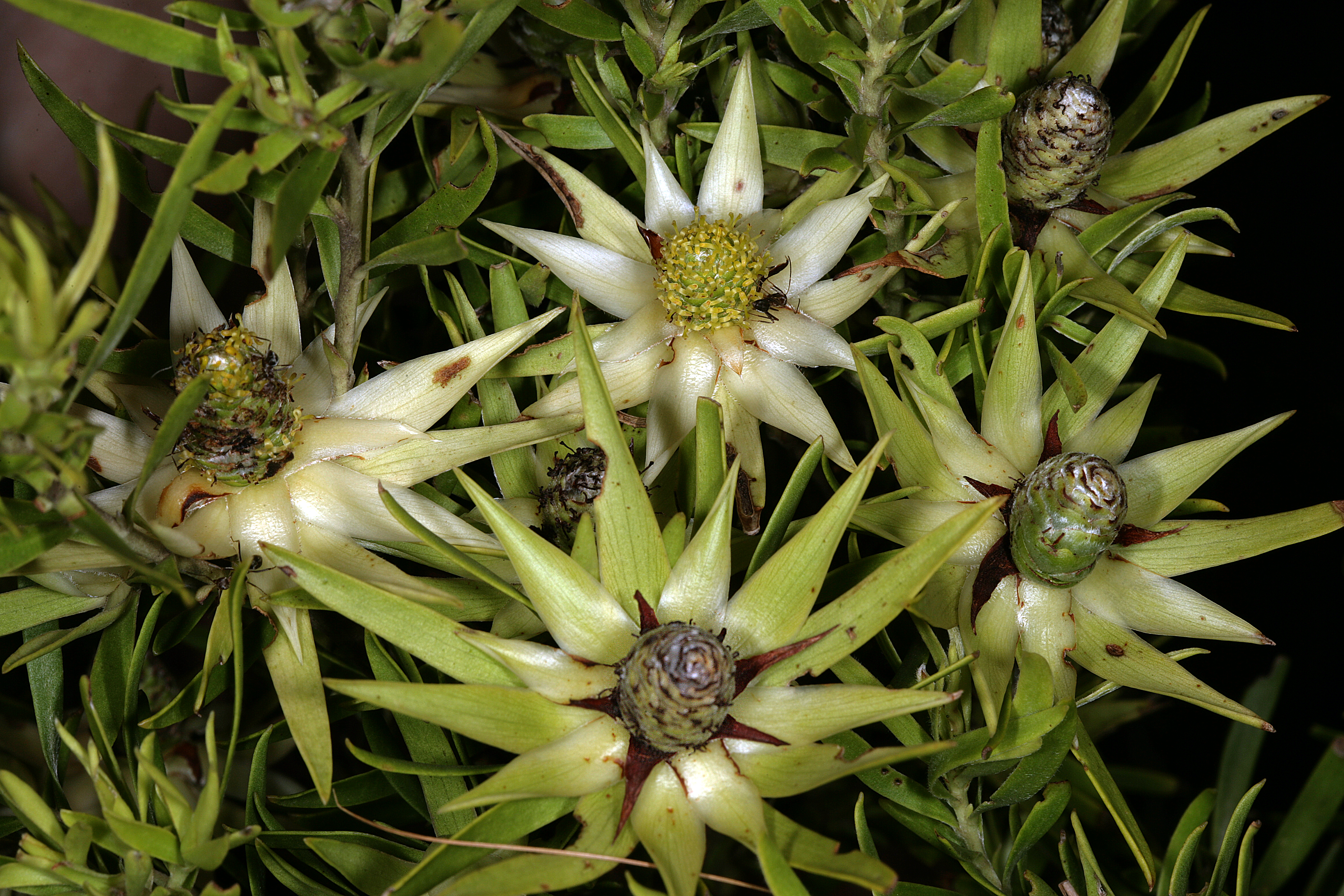

Conservation status
- Vulnerable (IUCN 3.1)

Scientific classification
- Kingdom: Plantae
- Clade: Tracheophytes
- Clade: Angiosperms
- Clade: Eudicots
- Order: Proteales
- Family: Proteaceae
- Genus: Leucadendron
- Species: L. spissifolium
- Subspecies: L. s. subsp. oribinum

Trinomial name
- Leucadendron spissifolium subsp. oribinum I.Williams

= Leucadendron spissifolium subsp. oribinum =

Subspecies of plant

Leucadendron spissifolium subsp. oribinum, the Oribi spear-leaf conebush, is a flower-bearing shrub belonging to the genus Leucadendron and forms part of the fynbos. The plant is native to the Eastern Cape and KwaZulu-Natal where it occurs from the Oribi Plain to Mkambati.

The shrub grows to 1.5 tall and sprouts again after a fire. It is differentiated by other subspecies by its sickle-shaped leaves. The shrub blooms from October to November. The seeds are stored in a toll on the female plant and first fall to the ground after a fire and are spread by the wind, the seeds have wings. The plant is unisexual and there are separate plants with male and female flowers, which are pollinated by insects. The plant grows mainly on steep slopes at altitudes of 300 – 500 m.
