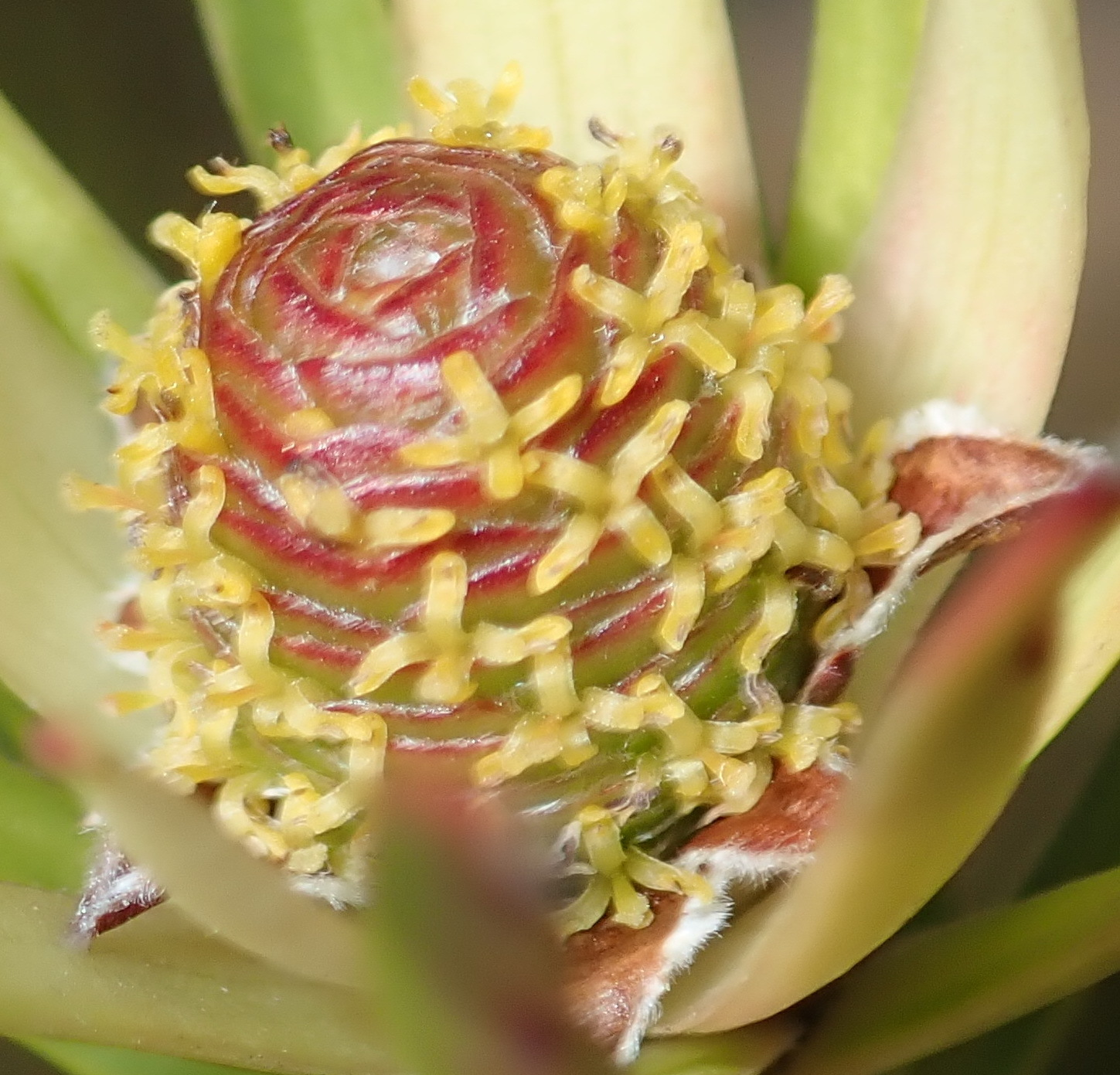

Conservation status
- Least Concern (IUCN 3.1)

Scientific classification
- Kingdom: Plantae
- Clade: Embryophytes
- Clade: Tracheophytes
- Clade: Angiosperms
- Clade: Eudicots
- Order: Proteales
- Family: Proteaceae
- Genus: Leucadendron
- Species: L. spissifolium
- Subspecies: L. s. subsp. fragrans

Trinomial name
- Leucadendron spissifolium subsp. fragrans I.Williams

= Leucadendron spissifolium subsp. fragrans =

Subspecies of plant

Leucadendron spissifolium subsp. fragrans, the fragrant spear-leaf conebush, is a flower-bearing shrub belonging to the genus Leucadendron. The plant is native to the Western Cape and occurs in the Langeberg and Outeniqua Mountains from Gysmanshoek to the Woodville Forest Reserve, as well as the Swartberg and Kammanassie Mountains. It forms part of the fynbos.

The subspecies grows up to 1.3 meters tall and flowers from September to October. The seeds are stored in woody toll structures that shelter the seeds and prevent them from germinating. The winged seeds are released from these tolls when they are exposed to fire, allowing them to travel away from the parent plant on the wind. The plant is unisexual and there are separate plants with male and female flowers, which are pollinated by insects. The plant grows mainly in sandstone soil on the crests and southern slopes at altitudes of 500 – 1800 m. The subspecies can be distinguished from others by its hairless leaves and conical bracts.

== Gallery ==
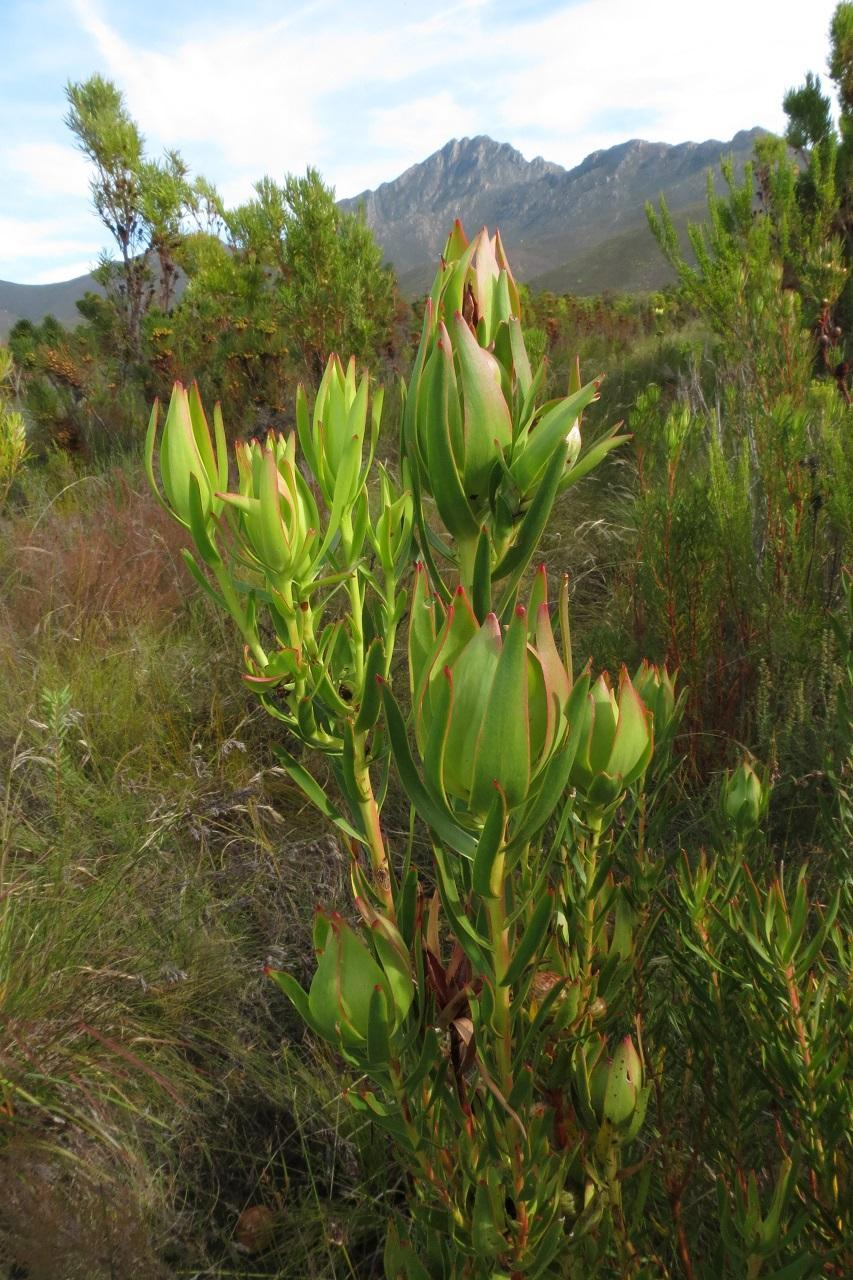

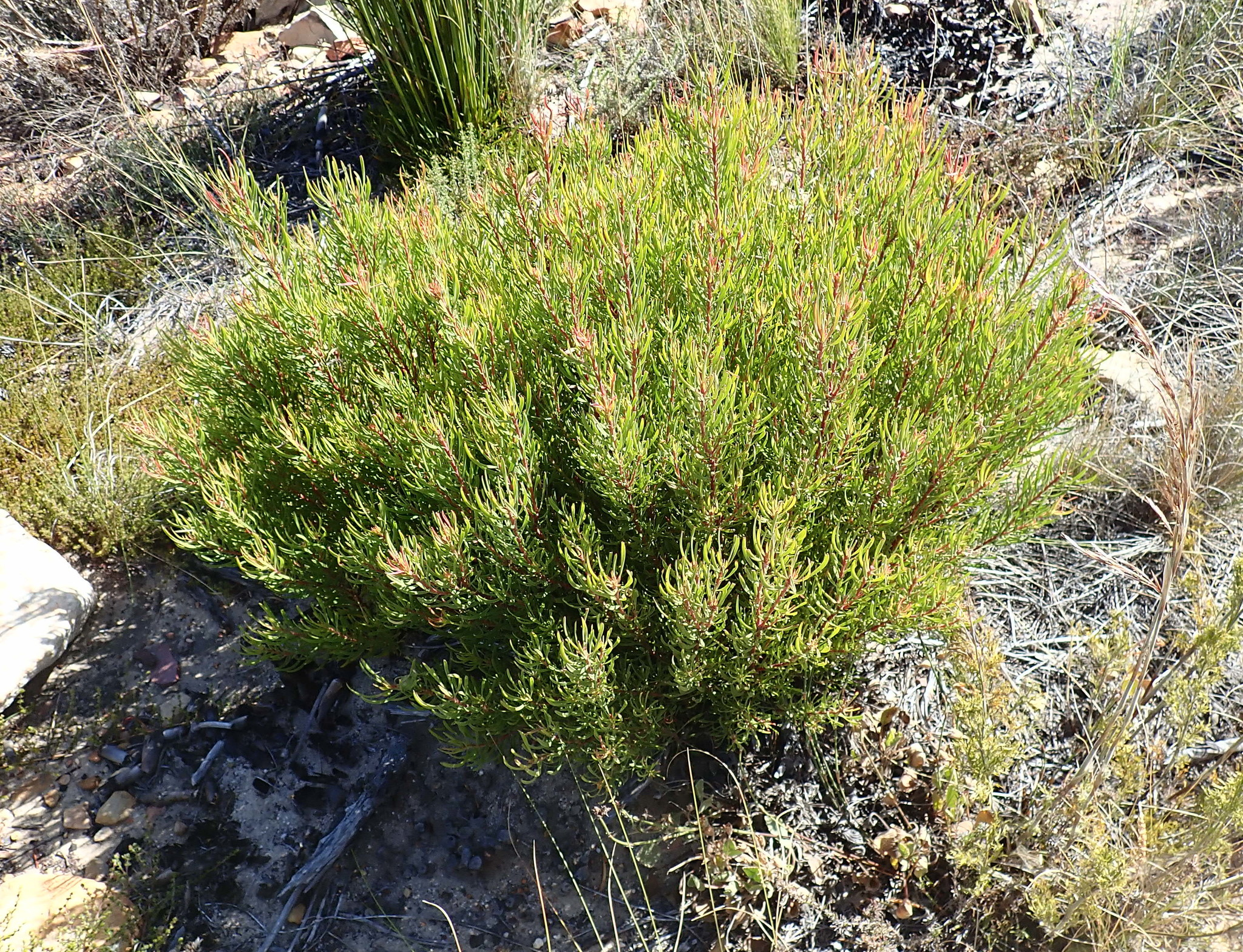

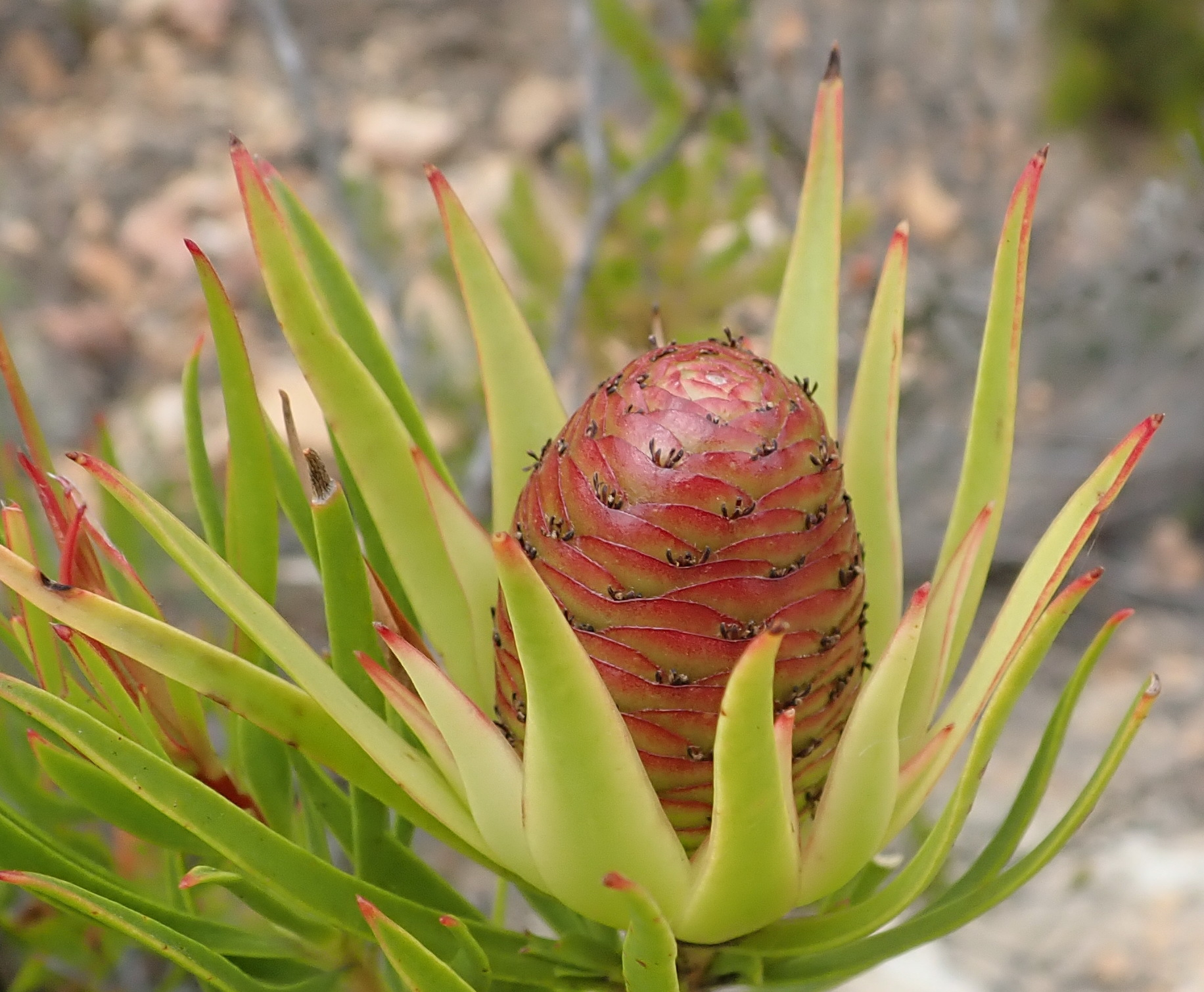

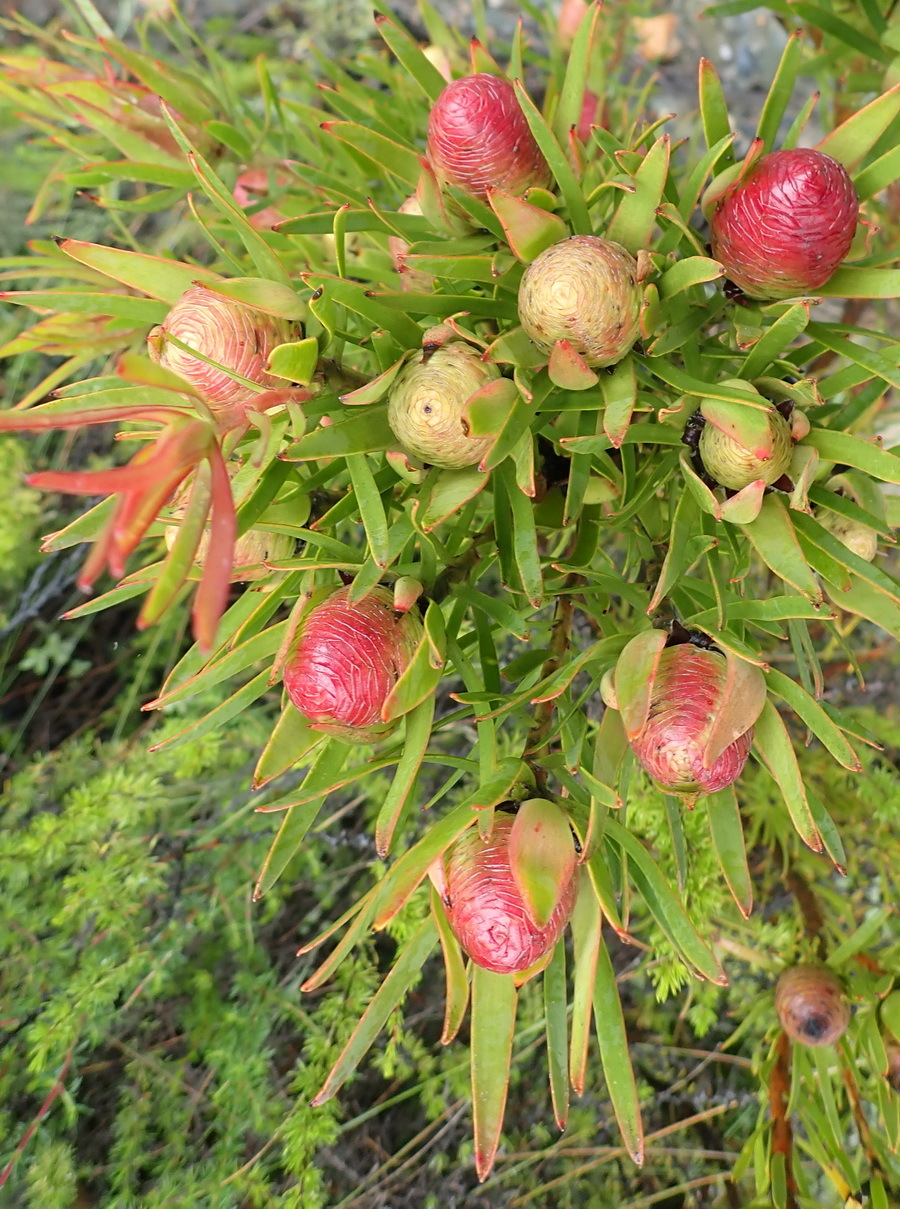

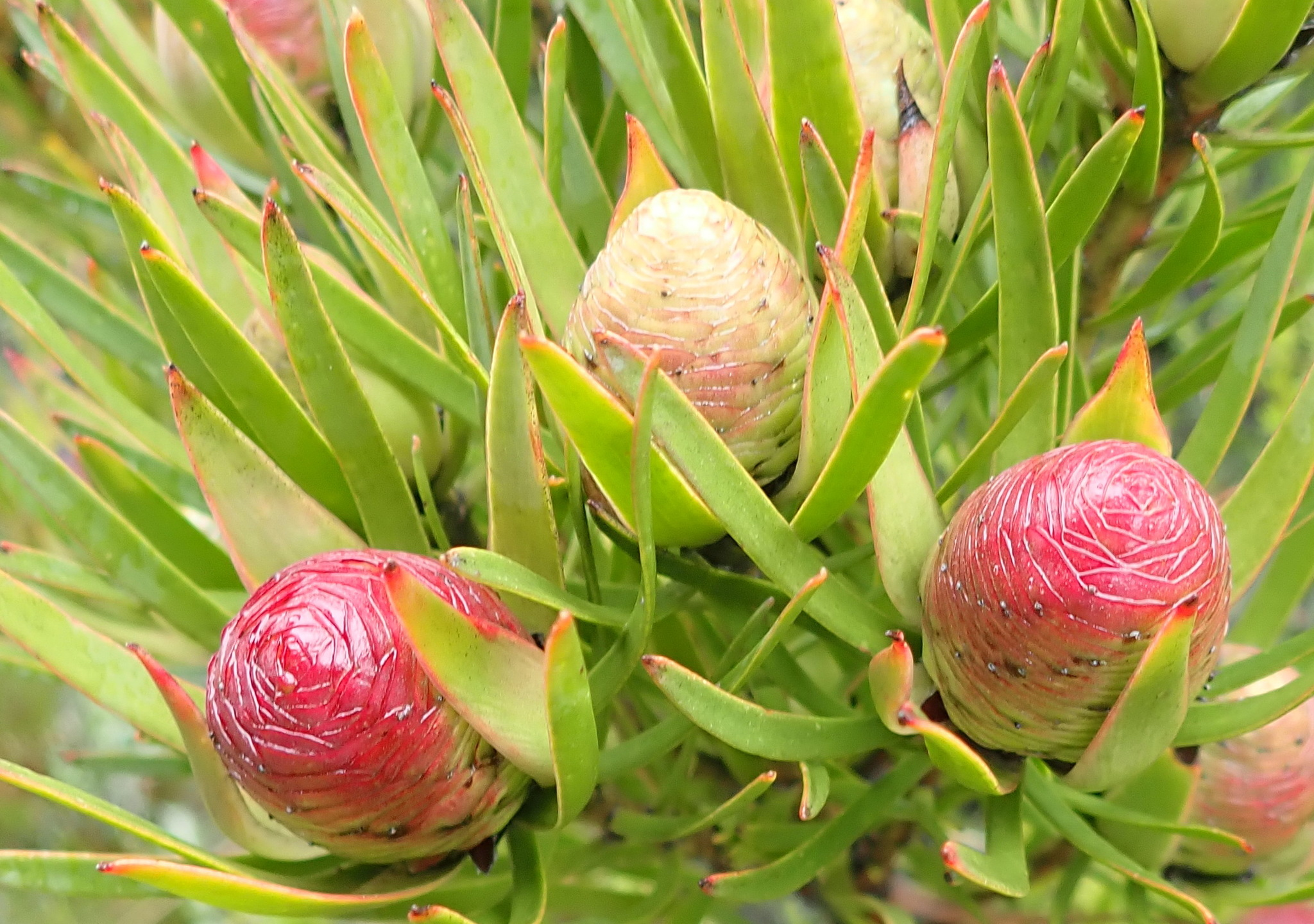
