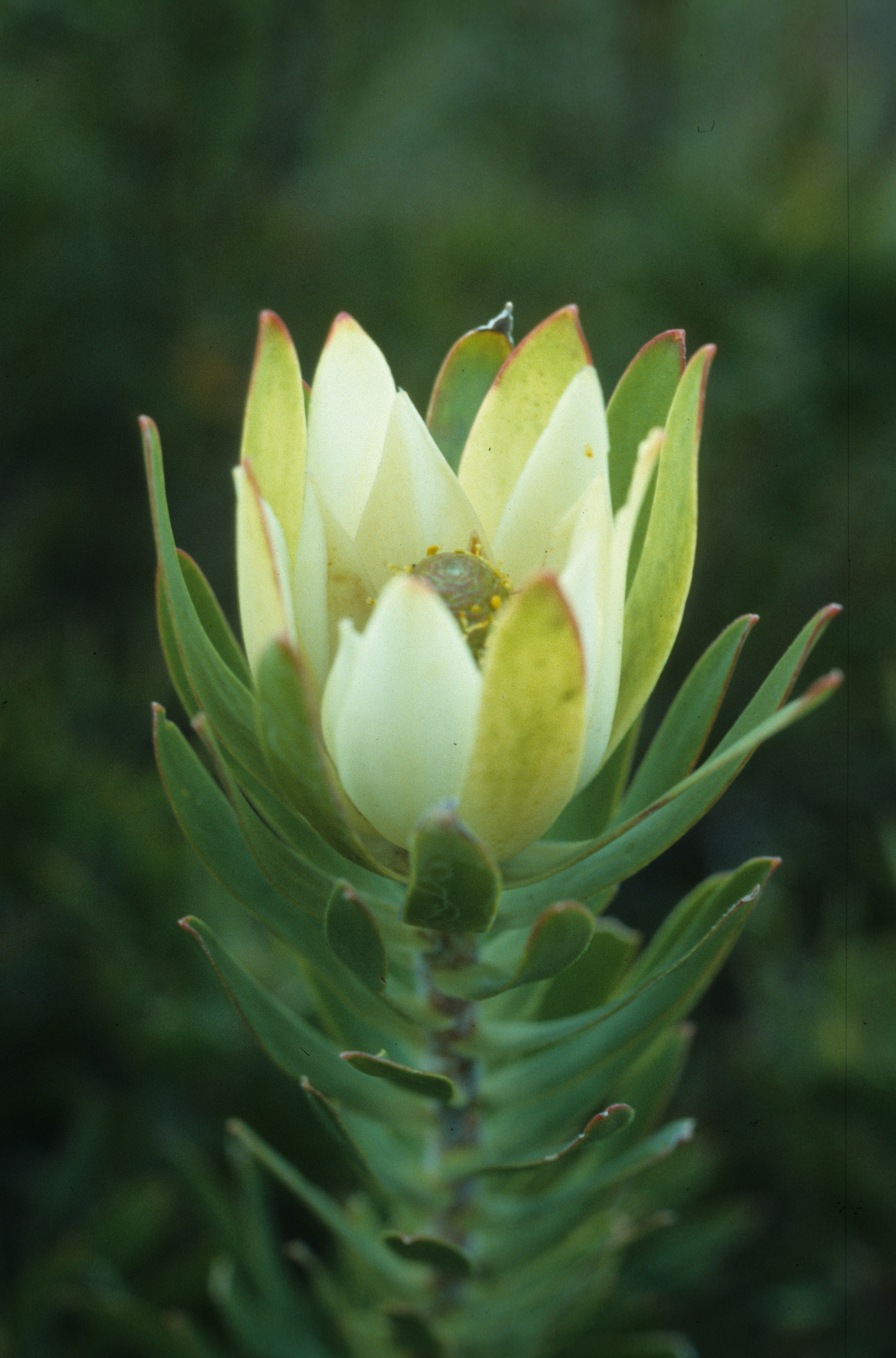

Conservation status
- Least Concern (IUCN 3.1)

Scientific classification
- Kingdom: Plantae
- Clade: Tracheophytes
- Clade: Angiosperms
- Clade: Eudicots
- Order: Proteales
- Family: Proteaceae
- Genus: Leucadendron
- Species: L. spissifolium

Binomial name
- Leucadendron spissifolium (Salisb. ex Knight) I.Williams

Synonyms
- Euryspermum spissifolium Knight (1809); Leucadendron decorum var. minus Buek.; Leucadendron virgatum f. gnidioides Gand.

= Leucadendron spissifolium =

Species of plant

Leucadendron spissifolium, the spear-leaf conebush, is a species of plant in the family Proteaceae. It was first described in 1809 as Euryspermum spissifolium. It was renamed Leucadendron spissifolium in 1967.

== Description ==
Leucadendron spissifolium is endemic to grasslands and shrublands of South Africa. The species is pyrophytic, and requires wildfires to disperse seeds. Flowers are dioecious and pollinated by insects.

== Subspecies ==
There are five subspecies recognized under L. spissifolium.

- Leucadendron spissifolium subsp. spissifolium (Common spear-leaf conebush)
- Leucadendron spissifolium subsp. fragrans (Fragrant spear-leaf conebush)
- Leucadendron spissifolium subsp. natalense (Natal spear-leaf conebush)
- Leucadendron spissifolium subsp. oribinum (Oribi spear-leaf conebush)
- Leucadendron spissifolium subsp. phillipsii (Kareedouwvlakte spear-leaf conebush)
