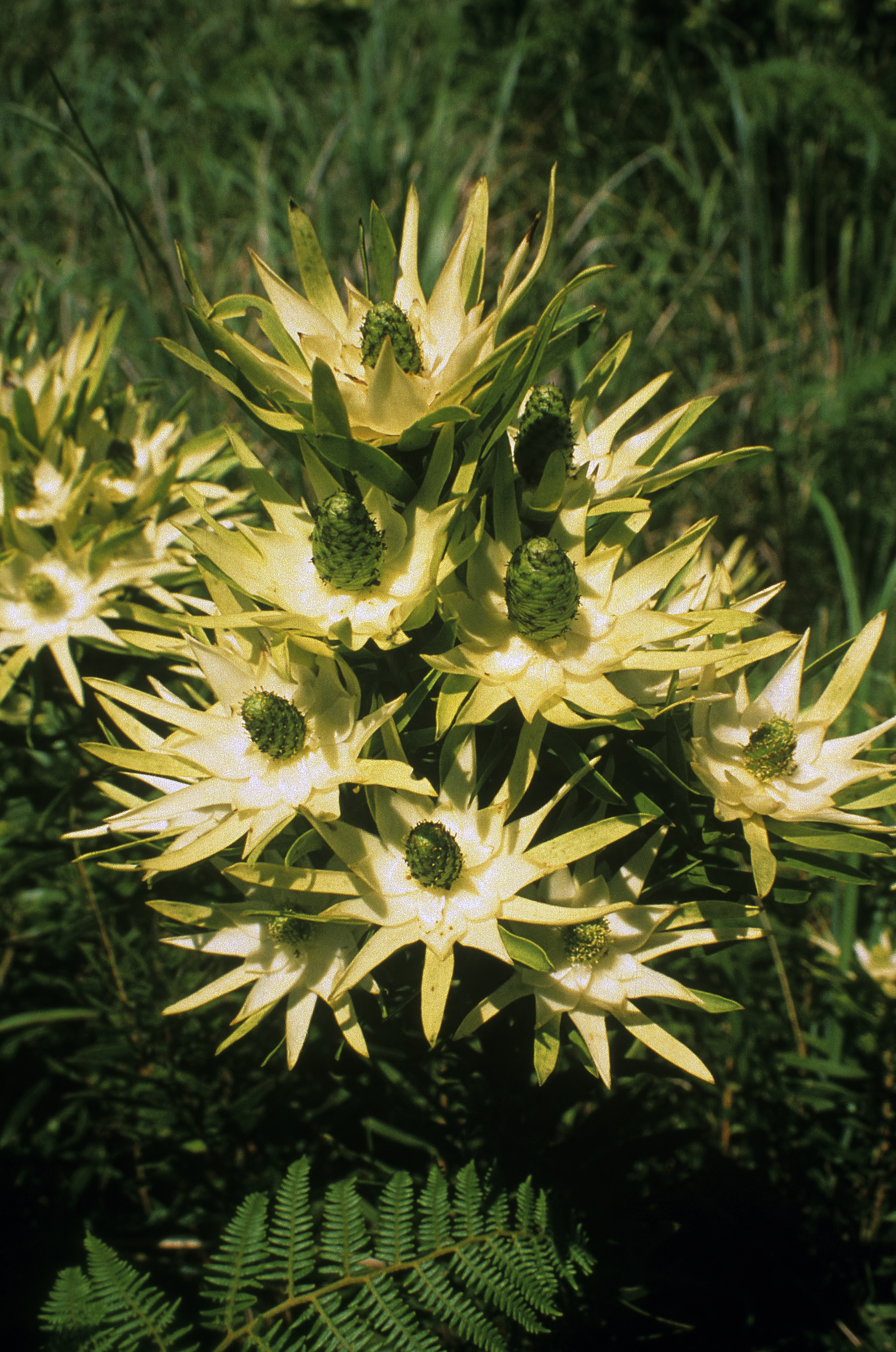

Conservation status
- Vulnerable (IUCN 3.1)

Scientific classification
- Kingdom: Plantae
- Clade: Tracheophytes
- Clade: Angiosperms
- Clade: Eudicots
- Order: Proteales
- Family: Proteaceae
- Genus: Leucadendron
- Species: L. spissifolium
- Subspecies: L. s. subsp. natalense

Trinomial name
- Leucadendron spissifolium subsp. natalense (Thode & Gilg) I.Williams

= Leucadendron spissifolium subsp. natalense =

Subspecies of plant

Leucadendron spissifolium subsp. natalense, the Natal spear-leaf conebush, is a flower-bearing shrub belonging to the genus Leucadendron and forms part of the fynbos. The plant is native to the Eastern Cape and KwaZulu-Natal where it occurs from the Oribi Gorge to Port St Johns. It may also occur in the Dwesa Nature Reserve on the Wild Coast.

The shrub sprouts again after a fire. The seeds are stored in a toll on the female plant and first fall to the ground after a fire and are spread by the wind, the seeds have wings. The plant is unisexual and there are separate plants with male and female flowers, which are pollinated by insects. The plant grows mainly in moist coastal sandstone and grasslands at altitudes of 30 – 500 m.

== Gallery ==
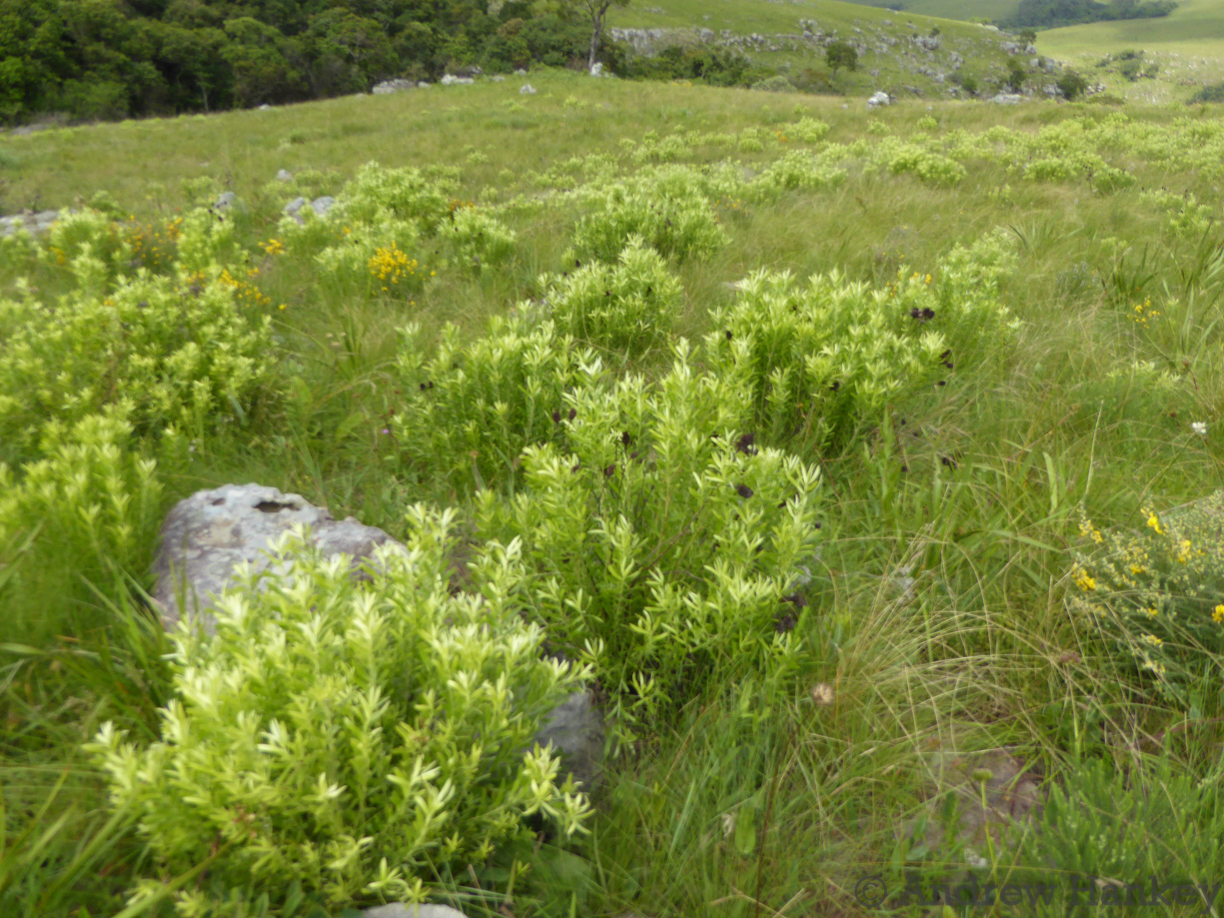

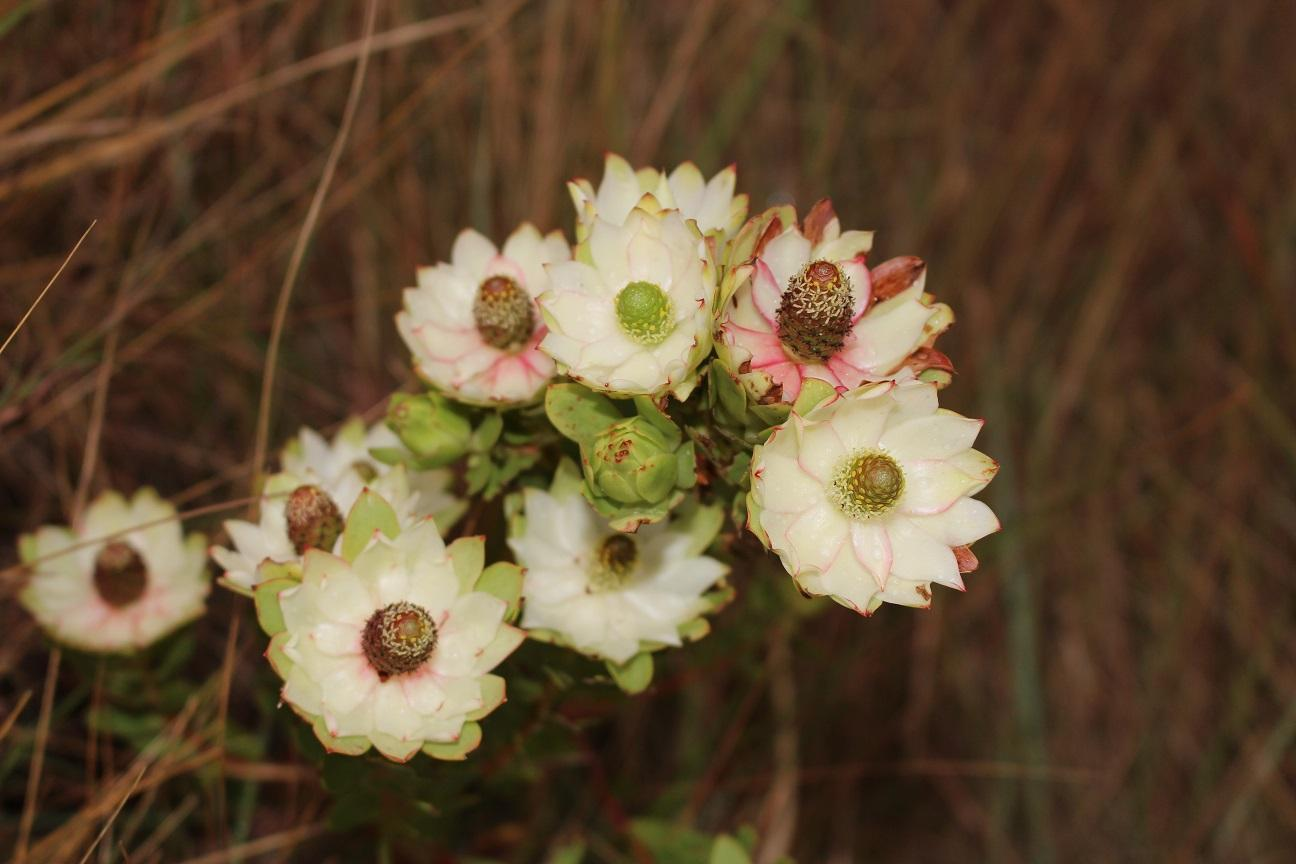

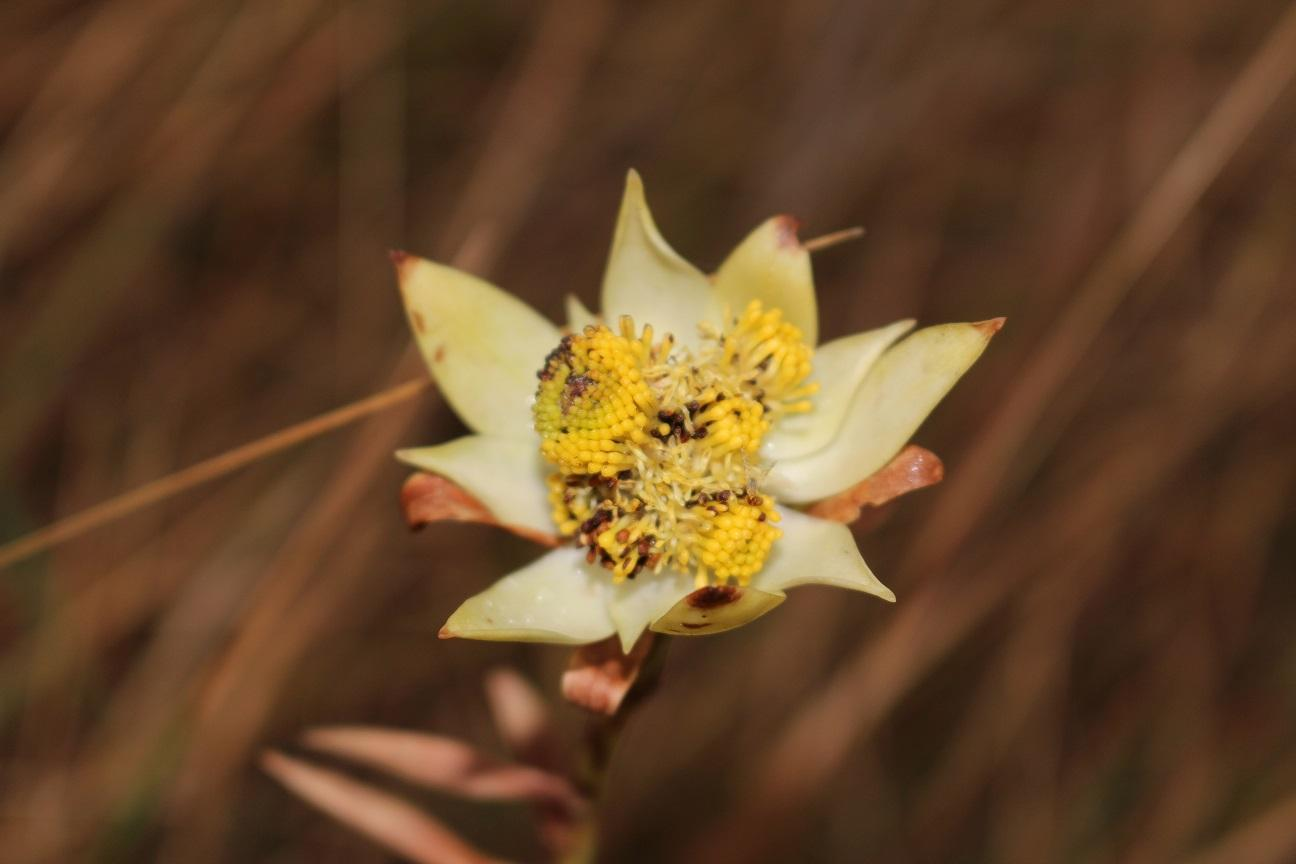

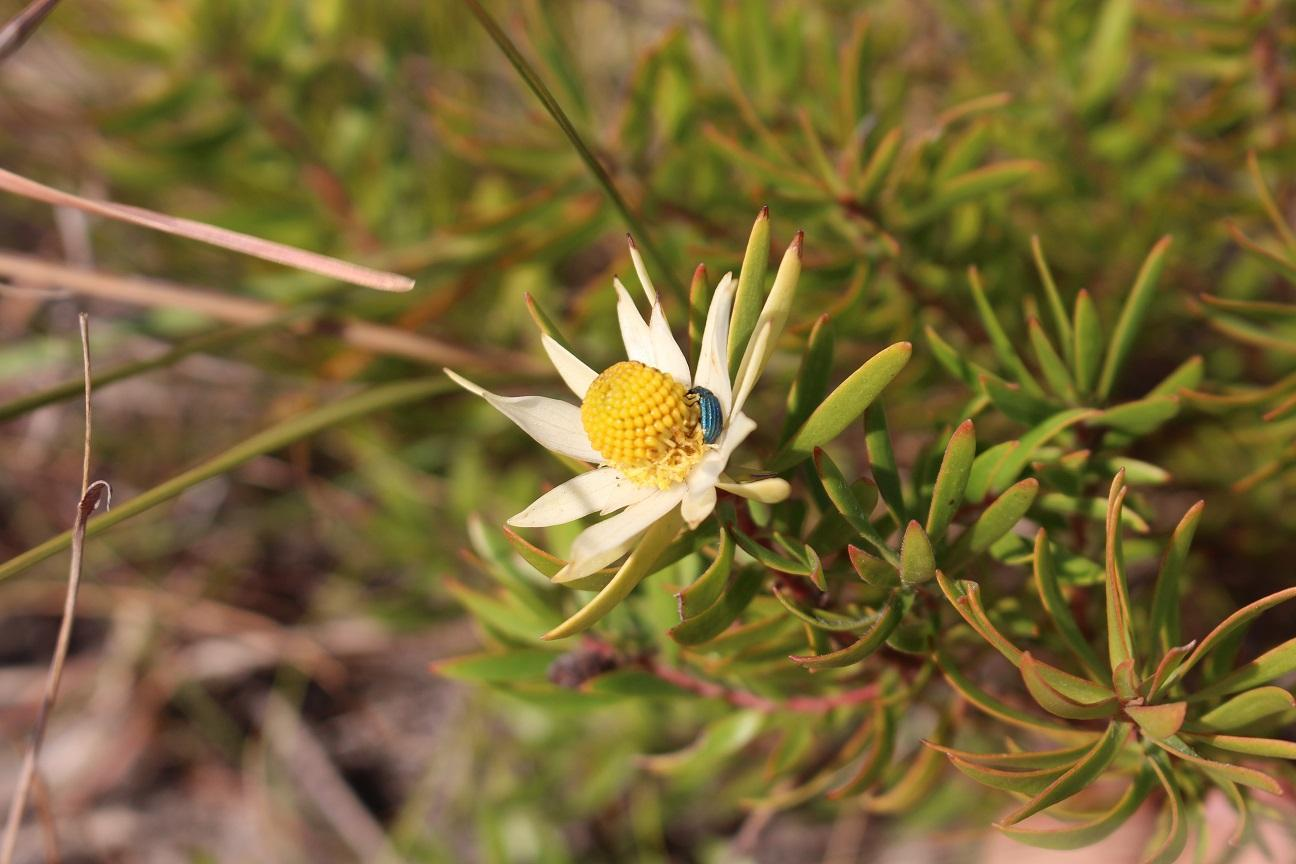

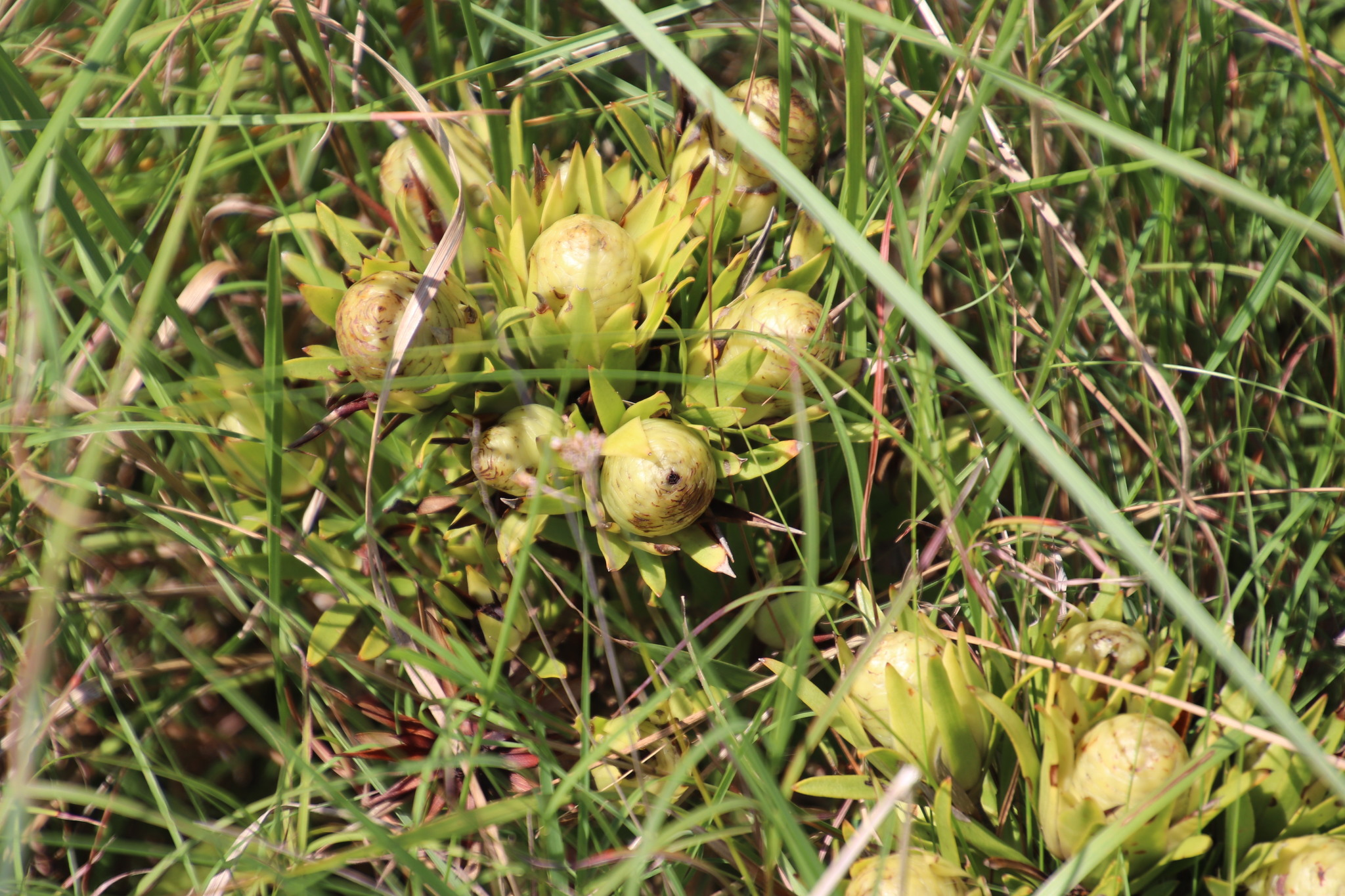

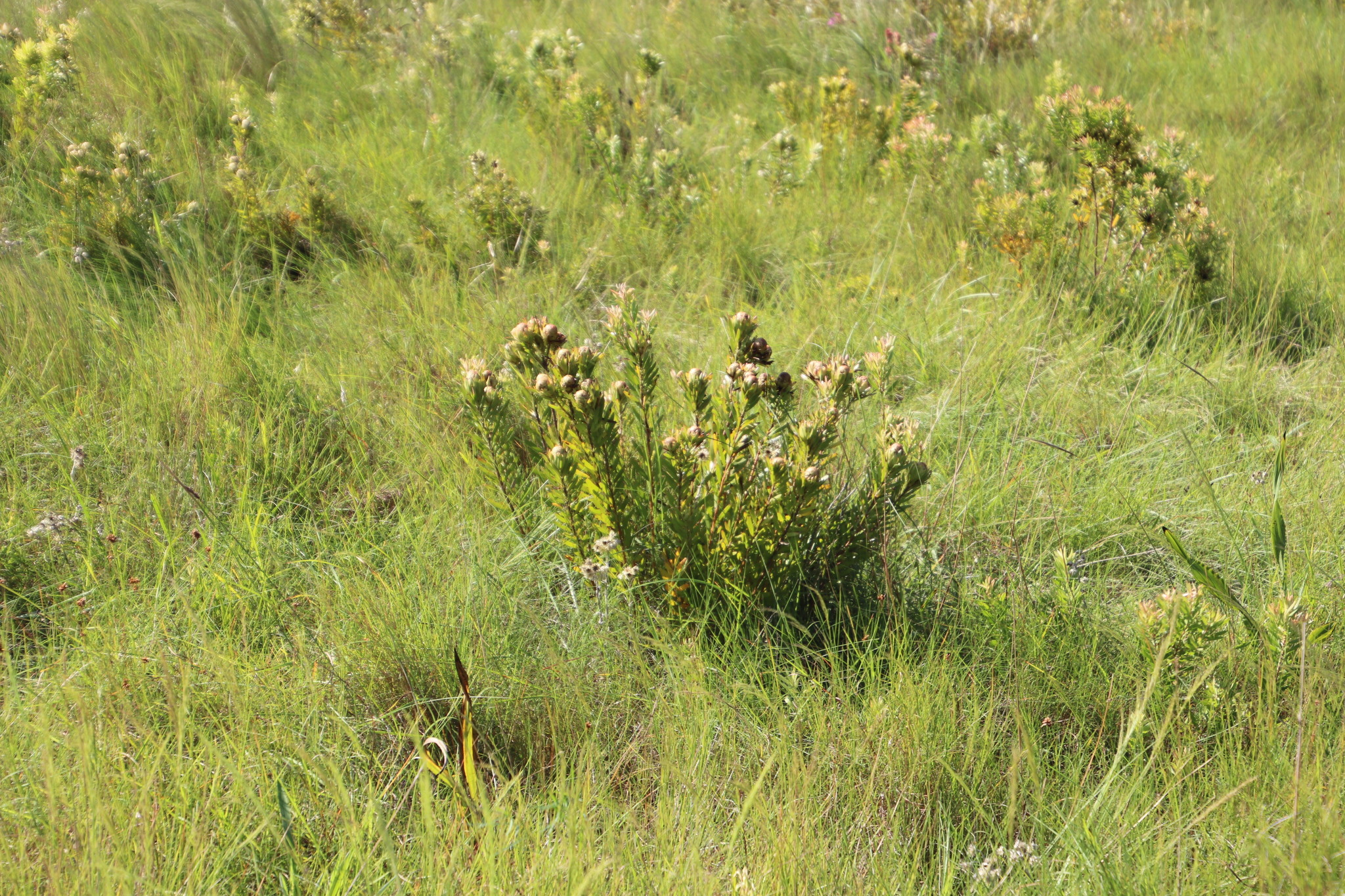
