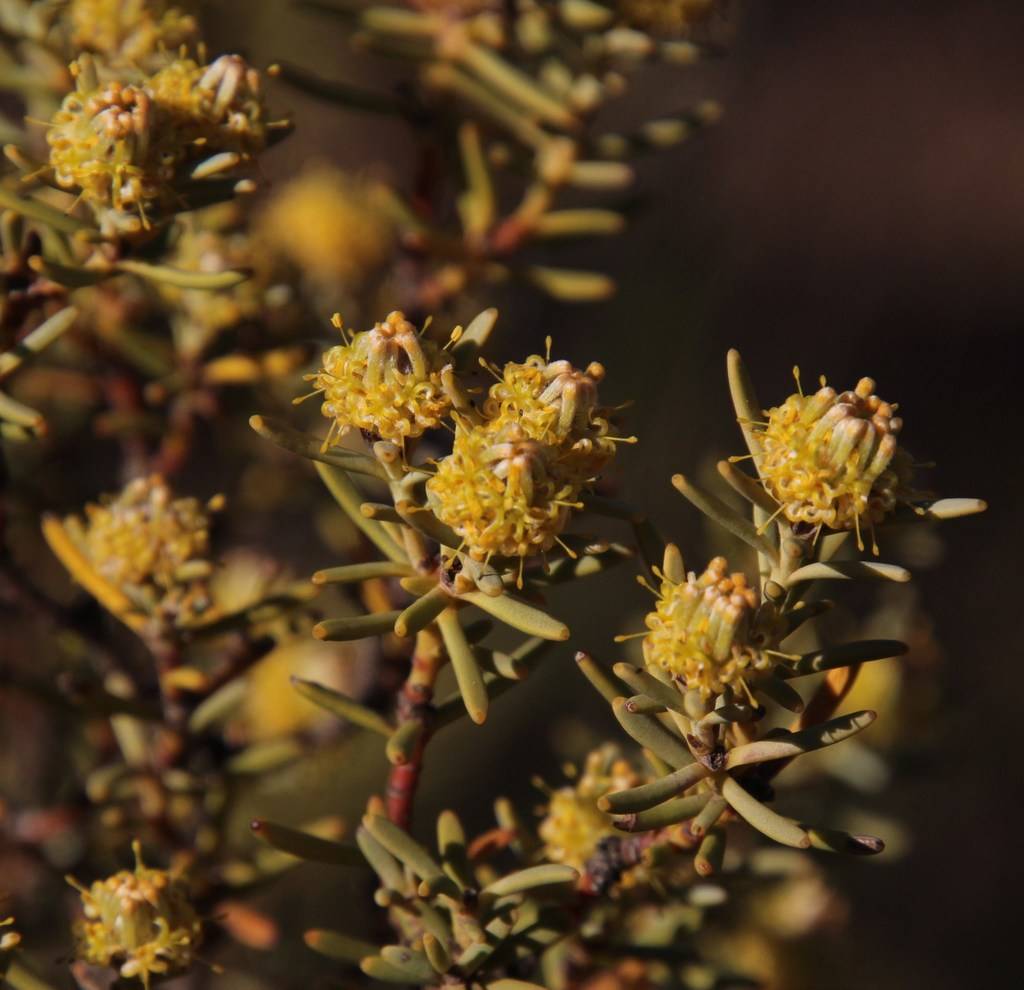
- Leucadendron brunioides var. brunioides

Conservation status
- Least Concern (IUCN 3.1)

Scientific classification
- Kingdom: Plantae
- Clade: Tracheophytes
- Clade: Angiosperms
- Clade: Eudicots
- Order: Proteales
- Family: Proteaceae
- Genus: Leucadendron
- Species: L. brunioides

Binomial name
- Leucadendron brunioides Meisn.

Synonyms
- Leucadendron stellatum Sweet; Protea bruniodes (Meisn.) Kuntze; Protea squarrosa Knight

= Leucadendron brunioides =

Species of plant

Leucadendron brunioides, the foetid conebush, is a species of plant in the family Proteaceae. It was first described in 1856 by Carl Meissner.

== Description ==
Leucadendron brunioides is endemic to sandy flats and shrublands of South Africa. The species survives wildfires. Flowers are dioecious and pollinated by insects.

== Varieties ==
There are two varieties recognized under L. brunioides.

- Leucadendron brunioides var. brunioides
- Leucadendron brunioides var. flumenlupinum
