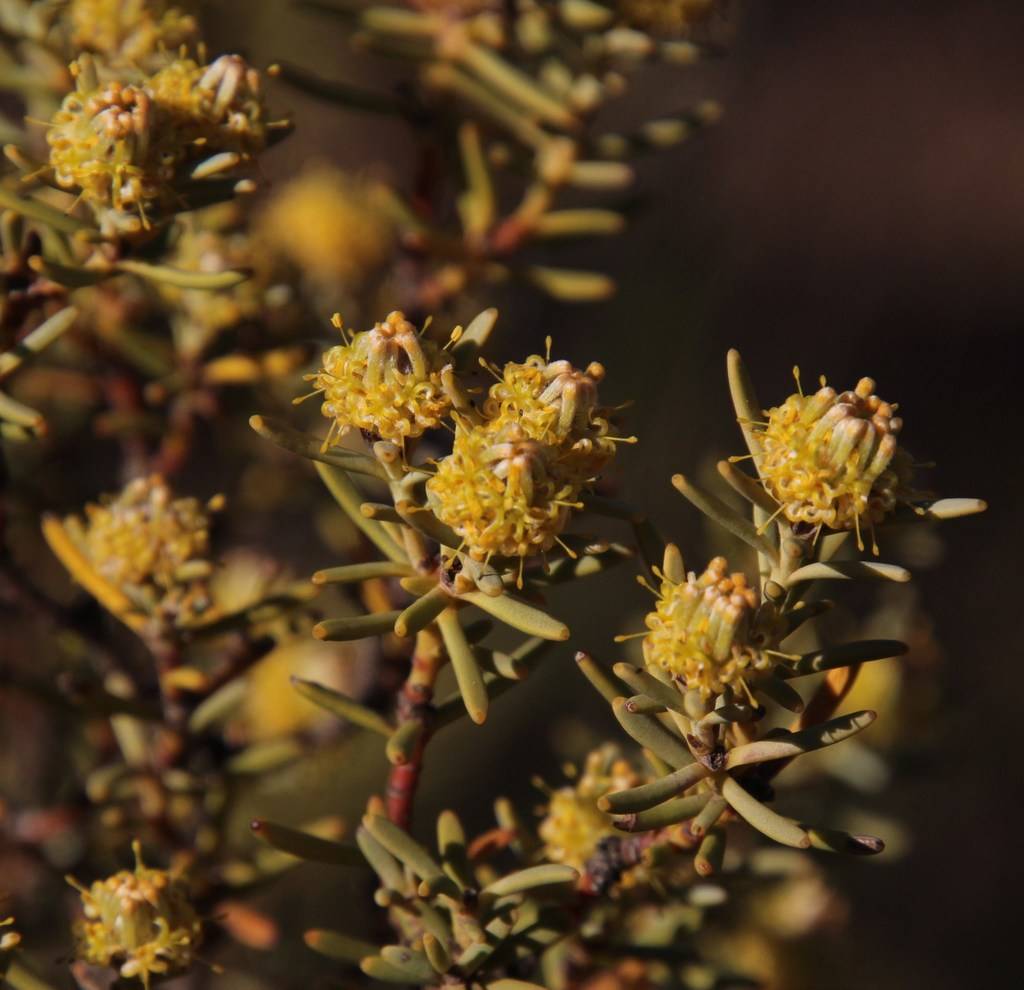

Conservation status
- Least Concern (IUCN 3.1)

Scientific classification
- Kingdom: Plantae
- Clade: Tracheophytes
- Clade: Angiosperms
- Clade: Eudicots
- Order: Proteales
- Family: Proteaceae
- Genus: Leucadendron
- Species: L. brunioides Meisn.
- Variety: L. b. var. brunioides

Trinomial name
- Leucadendron brunioides var. brunioides

= Leucadendron brunioides var. brunioides =

Variety of plant

Leucadendron brunioides var. brunioides, the common foetid conebush, is a flower-bearing shrub and variety of Leucadendron brunioides, which belongs to the genus Leucadendron and forms part of the fynbos. The plant is native to the Western Cape where it occurs on the Bokkeveld Carp near Nieuwoudtville, the Sandveld, Gifberg, Cederberg to the eastern Koue Bokkeveld, Hex River Mountains, and the Breede River Valley.

The plant sprouts again after it has burned. The seeds are stored in a toll on the female plant and only fall to the ground when the flower has ripened and are spread by wind. The plant is unisexual and there are separate plants with male and female flowers, which are pollinated by insects. The plant grows mainly in deep sandstone soil in valleys at altitudes of 100 - 1,000 m.

In Afrikaans it is known as Tolletjies.
