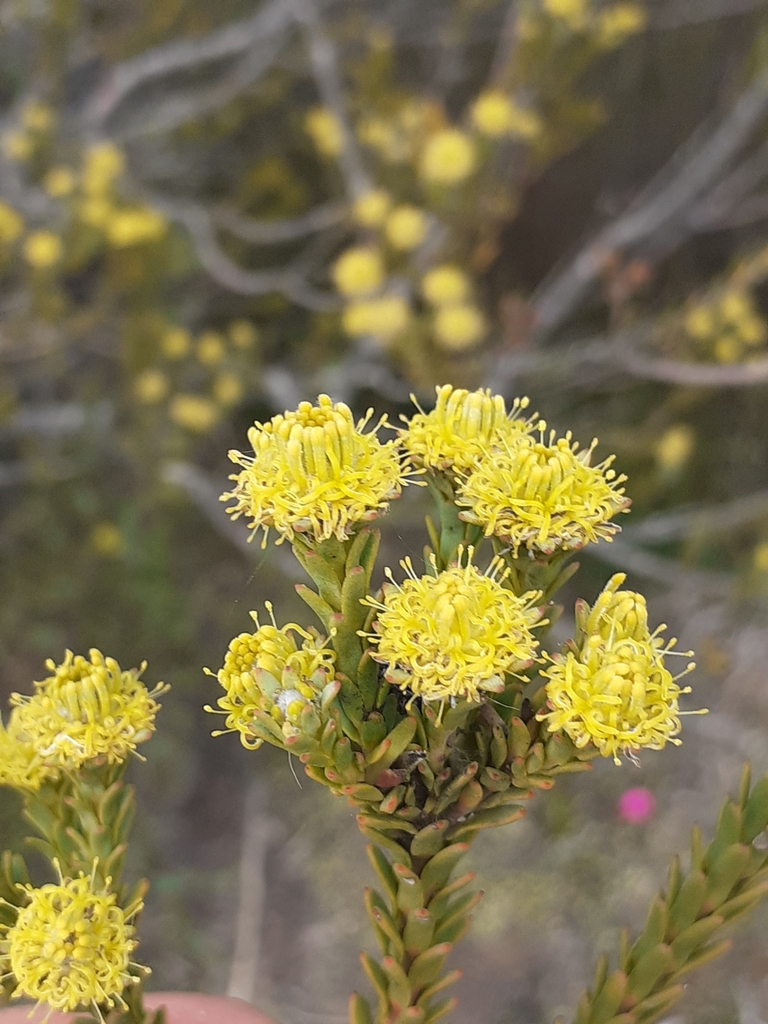

Conservation status
- Endangered (IUCN 3.1)

Scientific classification
- Kingdom: Plantae
- Clade: Tracheophytes
- Clade: Angiosperms
- Clade: Eudicots
- Order: Proteales
- Family: Proteaceae
- Genus: Leucadendron
- Species: L. brunioides
- Variety: L. b. var. flumenlupinum

Trinomial name
- Leucadendron brunioides var. flumenlupinum I.Williams

= Leucadendron brunioides var. flumenlupinum =

Variety of plant

Leucadendron brunioides var. flumenlupinum, the Graafwater conebush, is a flower-bearing shrub and variety of Leucadendron brunioides, which belongs to the genus Leucadendron and forms part of the fynbos. The plant is native to the Western Cape where it occurs from Graafwater to Aurora and Eendekuil.

The plant sprouts again after it has burned. The seeds are stored in a toll on the female plant and only fall to the ground when the flower has ripened and is spread by wind. The plant is unisexual and there are separate plants with male and female flowers, which are pollinated by insects. The plant grows mainly in moist habitats such as river beds.
