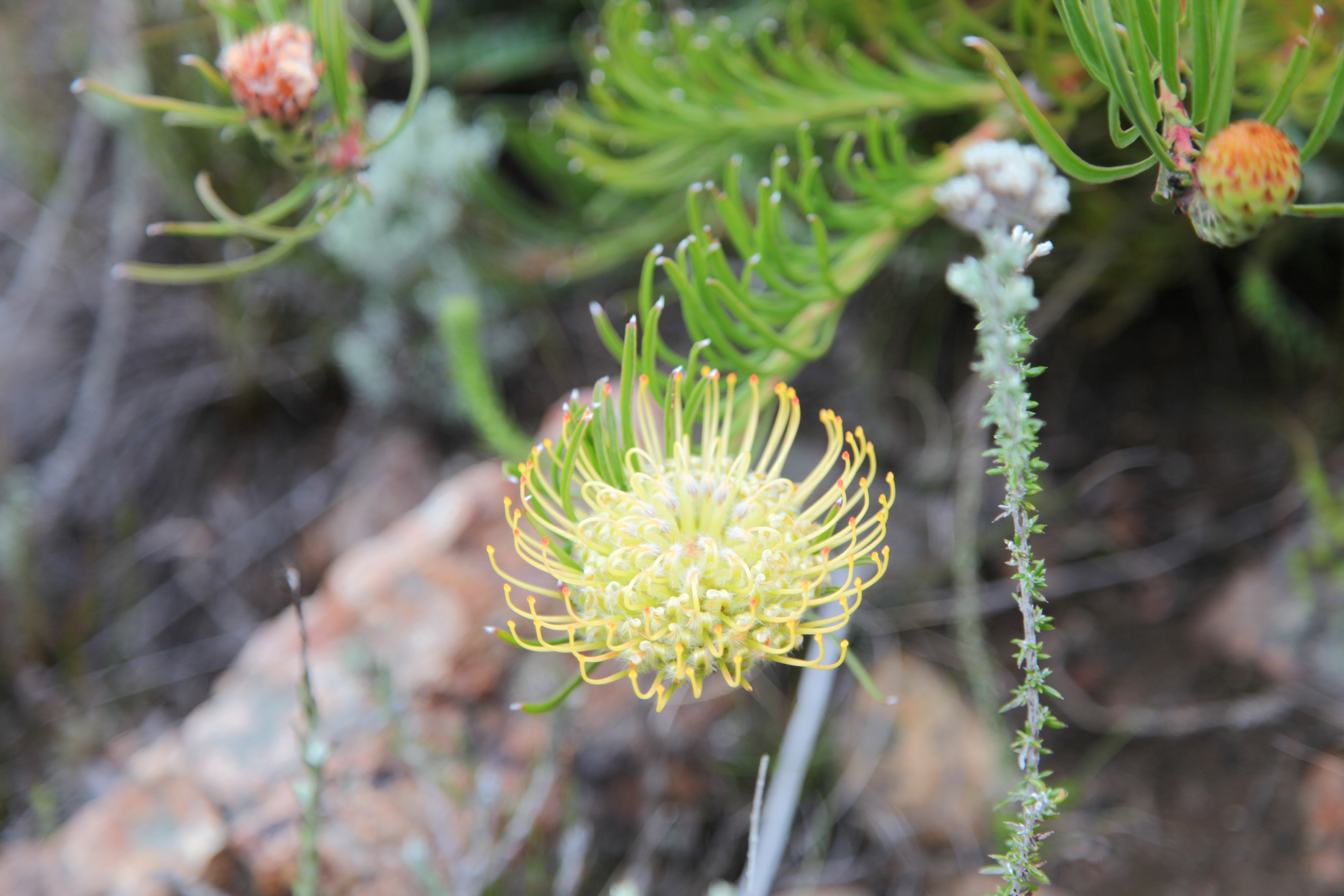

Conservation status
- Near Threatened (IUCN 3.1)

Scientific classification
- Kingdom: Plantae
- Clade: Embryophytes
- Clade: Tracheophytes
- Clade: Angiosperms
- Clade: Eudicots
- Order: Proteales
- Family: Proteaceae
- Genus: Leucospermum
- Species: L. lineare

Binomial name
- Leucospermum lineare R.Br.

Synonyms
- Leucodendron lineare, Protea linearis Thunb., 1781 non Houtt., 1775; Leucadendrum fallax; Leucospermum lineare var. calocephalum, Leucospermum calocephalum

= Leucospermum lineare =

Species of plant native to South Africa

Leucospermum lineare is an evergreen shrub with linear leaves and is assigned to the Proteaceae. There are two distinct forms that have not been formally recognized as separate taxa. There is an upright form with orange flower heads of up to 2 m (6.6 ft) high, and a sprawling form of 2–3 m (6.6–9.8 ft) in diameter with yellow flower heads. Its common name is needle-leaf pincushion, or narrow-leaf pincushion, in English and smalblaarspeldekussing in Afrikaans. The orange-flowered form is called tangerine pincushion or assegaaibos pincushion. Flowering occurs in the first half of the southern hemisphere season, but peaks in September and October. It is an endemic species that can only be found in the southwest of the Western Cape province of South Africa.

== Description ==
Leucospermum lineare is an upright evergreen shrub of up to 2 m (6.6 ft) high, or a sprawling shrub of 3–4 m (9.8–13.1 ft) in diameter. The branches that bear flower heads are hairless 2–5 mm (0.079–0.197 in) in diameter, and may either be upright or spreading horizontally. The leaves are linear in shape and flat or with the margins rolled inwards, 4–10 cm (1.6–3.9 in) long and 2–7 mm (0.079–0.276 in) wide, pointing at an angle upwards, with two or three teeth near the leaf tip or without teeth.

The flower heads are usually solitary or grouped with two or three, have a flattened egg-shape, are 8–9 cm (3.1–3.5 in) in diameter, atop a stalk of 1–4 cm (0.39–1.57 in) long. The common base of the flowers within the same head has a very slim cone-shape with a pointy tip, 2–3 cm (0.79–1.18 in) long and 3–5 mm (0.12–0.20 in) wide. The bracts that subtend the flower head are oval with an pointy tip, about 1½ cm (0.6 in) long, overlapping, rubbery in consistency, softly hairy on the outside, with a dense row of hairs around the fringes. The bracts that subtend the individual flower are oval with a pointy tip, about 1 cm (0.4 in) long and 5–6 mm (0.20–0.24 in) wide, rubbery in consistency, and densely woolly at the base. The perianth is about 3 cm (1.2 in) long, S-shaped when opening, and pale yellow to orange in colour. Its base is fused into a tube of 7–8 mm (0.28–0.31 in) long, with a slight bulge at one side, smooth near the top. Perianth tube 7.0- 8.0 mm long. The anthers are atop a very short filament of about 1 mm. The style is 5–5½ cm (2.0–2.2 in) long, and near the upper end quadrangular and strongly bending towards the center of the flower head. It is topped by a slight thickening that is called the pollen presenter, which is obliquely oval in shape with a pointy tip, about 1½ mm (0.06 in) long, with the groove that functions as the stigma obliquely at the very tip. The oblong ovary look grey due to a dense cover of minute soft hairs, and surrounded by white hairs of about 2 mm (0.079 in) long, is subtended by four linear to awl-shaped scales that secrete the nectar (the so-called hypogynous scales) of about 2 mm (0.079 in) long.

The subtribe Proteinae, to which the genus Leucospermum has been assigned, consistently has a basic chromosome number of twelve (2n=24).

== Taxonomy ==
In 1768, Nicolaas Laurens Burman was the first to describe the needle-leaf pincushion, and he named it Leucadendron lineare. Carl Peter Thunberg assigned the species to the genus Protea, making the new combination P. linearis in 1781, but he had not noticed the name was already occupied in 1775, when Maarten Houttuyn used it for another species now known as Leucadendron ericifolium. Joseph Knight published a book in 1809 titled On the cultivation of the plants belonging to the natural order of Proteeae, that contained an extensive revision of the Proteaceae attributed to Richard Anthony Salisbury. Salisbury named the needle-leaf pincushion Leucadendrum fallax, a superfluous name since he referenced Burman, and should have adopted his species name. In 1810, Robert Brown called the species Leucospermum lineare, but referenced Thunberg's homonym, where he should have taken up Burman's name. Michel Gandoger in 1901 distinguished the upright and orange-flowered form as Leucospermum lineare var. calocephalum, which he raised together with Hans Schinz to a species in 1913, making the new combination Leucospermum calocephalum. In 1970, John Patrick Rourke considered these forms not sufficiently different to merit the distinction and so regarded them as synonymous.

L. lineare has been assigned to the showy pincushions, section Brevifilamentum.

The species name lineare is Latin, meaning "linear" or "line-shaped" and refers to the needle-like leaves.

== Distribution, habitat and ecology ==
The range of L. lineare extends from Bainskloof to the Klein Drakensteinberge. The form with horizontally sprawling branches and golden yellow flowers occurs is most widespread. An upright form with deep orange flowers grows at the Assegaaibos Kloof near French Hoek. The species mostly occurs in mountainous sites on heavy gravelly clay soils at elevations of 900–3,350 m (2,950–10,990 ft), with an average annual precipitation of 750–1,250 millimetres (30–49 in), most of which fall during the winter. In a few locations L. lineare occurs on Table Mountain Sandstone, but even there it is mostly underlain by weathered granite. Flowers can be found between July and January with a peak in September and October. Birds pollinate the flowers. The seeds fall from the flower heads after about 2 months. The seed is covered by a soft, sweet and fatty layer that emits pheromones (called elaiosome) that is coveted by ants. Indigenous ant species collect them and take them to their underground nests, where they eat the ant bread. The ants cannot move the large hard and slick seed when the ant bread is removed and so remains underground, safe from being eaten and fire. This seed dispersal strategy is called myrmecochory. Although the plants do not survive a fire, the seeds promptly germinate after a fire.

== Cultivation ==
Leucospermum lineare has been crossed with L. cordifolium, L. tottum and L. vestitum. Selections of the species and its hybrids are cultivated for cut-flowers and as garden plants.

== Conservation ==
Leucospermum lineare is considered a vulnerable species. The reasons for the decrease in population size include invasive plants, cut flower harvesting, and land transformation.
