= P. T. Barnum =

American showman and politician (1810–1891)

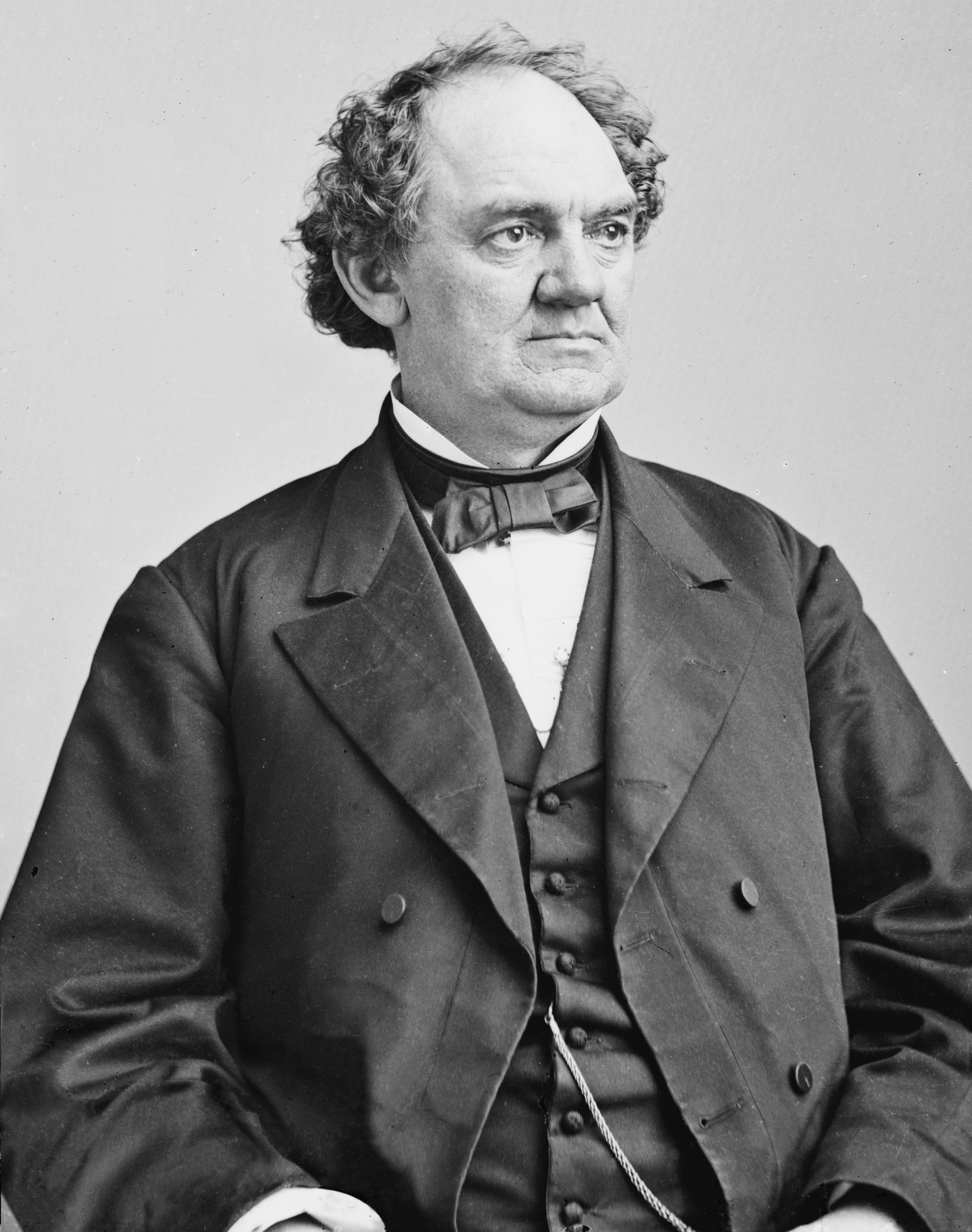
- Barnum, c. 1855–1865

Mayor of Bridgeport, Connecticut
- In office 1875–1876

Member of the Connecticut House of Representatives from the Fairfield district
- In office 1866–1869

Personal details
- Born: Phineas Taylor Barnum; July 5, 1810 Bethel, Connecticut, U.S.
- Died: April 7, 1891 (aged 80) Bridgeport, Connecticut, U.S.
- Resting place: Mountain Grove Cemetery, Bridgeport
- Party: Democratic (until 1854); Republican (after 1854)
- Spouses: Charity Hallett (m. 1829; died 1873) Nancy Fish (m. 1874)
- Children: 4
- Occupation: Showman; entrepreneur (entertainment as founder and promoter); politician; author; publisher; philanthropist
- Known for: Founding the Barnum & Bailey Circus

Phineas Taylor Barnum (July 5, 1810 – April 7, 1891) was an American showman, businessman, and politician remembered for promoting celebrated hoaxes and founding the Ringling Bros. and Barnum & Bailey Circus with James Anthony Bailey. He was also an author, publisher, and philanthropist, although he said of himself: "I am a showman by profession ... and all the gilding shall make nothing else of me." The adage "there's a sucker born every minute" has frequently been attributed to him, although no evidence exists that he had coined the phrase.

Barnum became a small-business owner in his early twenties and founded a weekly newspaper before moving to New York City in 1834. He embarked on an entertainment career, first with a variety troupe called "Barnum's Grand Scientific and Musical Theater", and soon after by purchasing Scudder's American Museum, which he renamed after himself. He used the museum as a platform to promote hoaxes and human curiosities such as the Fiji mermaid and General Tom Thumb. In 1850, he promoted the American tour of Swedish opera singer Jenny Lind, paying her an unprecedented $1,000, equivalent to $38,700 in 2025, per night for 150 nights. He suffered economic reversals in the 1850s from unwise investments, as well as years of litigation and public humiliation, but he embarked on a lecture tour as a temperance speaker to emerge from debt. His museum added America's first aquarium and expanded its wax-figure department.

Barnum served two terms in the Connecticut legislature in 1865 as a Republican for Fairfield, Connecticut. He spoke before the legislature concerning the ratification of the Thirteenth Amendment to the United States Constitution, which abolished slavery and involuntary servitude: "A human soul, 'that God has created and Christ died for,' is not to be trifled with. It may tenant the body of a Chinaman, a Turk, an Arab, or a Hottentot—it is still an immortal spirit." He was elected in 1875 as mayor of Bridgeport, Connecticut, where he worked to improve the water supply, bring gas lighting to streets and enforce liquor and prostitution laws. He was instrumental in the inception of Bridgeport Hospital in 1878 and was its first president. The circus business, begun when he was 60 years old, was the source of much of his enduring fame. He established P. T. Barnum's Grand Traveling Museum, Menagerie, Caravan & Hippodrome in 1870, a traveling circus, menagerie and museum of "freaks" that adopted many names over the years.

Barnum was married to Charity Hallett from 1829 until her death in 1873, and they had four children. In 1874, a few months after his wife's death, he married Nancy Fish, his friend's daughter and 40 years his junior. They were married until 1891 when Barnum died of a stroke at his home. He was buried in Mountain Grove Cemetery, Bridgeport, which he designed himself.

== Early life and family ==
Barnum was born in Bethel, Connecticut, the son of innkeeper, tailor and storekeeper Philo Barnum (1778–1826) and Philo's second wife, Irena Taylor. Barnum's maternal grandfather Phineas Taylor (known as Uncle Phin) was a Whig, legislator, landowner, justice of the peace, lottery schemer, and practical joker who had a great influence upon his grandson.

Barnum began school at the age of six, despite his family's minimal resources. Throughout his years of schooling, Barnum's mathematic skills strongly advanced, leading him to strategically get out of his farming chores. At just 12 years old, Barnum made money by selling cherry-rum to soldiers and was even employed to assist a cattle drive from Bethel, Connecticut to Brooklyn, New York.

== Career beginnings ==
Barnum ran several businesses, including a general store, a book-auctioning trade, real estate speculation and a statewide lottery network. Concerned about the Congregational Church's interference in political affairs in Connecticut, he started a weekly newspaper in 1831 called The Herald of Freedom in Bethel. His editorials against the elders of local churches led to libel suits and prosecution, and he was imprisoned for two months. While incarcerated, Barnum sought the help of Rev. L. F. W. Andrews, publisher of the Gospel Witness from Hartford. Barnum and Andrews then published a joint paper, the Herald of Freedom and Gospel Witness. They dissolved their partnership a year later in October 1833. Barnum then moved the publication of the paper to neighboring Danbury, Connecticut.

In November 1834, after publishing 160 issues of the Herald of Freedom, Barnum passed control of the paper to his brother-in-law, John W. Amerman, who published the paper for another year in Norwalk, Connecticut. When Amerman sold the paper to Mr. George Taylor, the Barnum family's connection to the Herald of Freedom ended. Barnum sold his store in 1834.

He began his career as a showman in 1835 at the age of 25 with the purchase and exhibition of a blind and almost completely paralyzed enslaved woman named Joice Heth, whom an acquaintance was billing around Philadelphia as George Washington's 161-year-old former nurse. Slavery was already outlawed in New York, but Barnum exploited a loophole that allowed him to lease Heth for a year for $1,000, borrowing $500 to complete the sale. Barnum forced her to work for 10 to 12 hours per day, and she died in February 1836 at no more than 80 years of age. Barnum hosted a live autopsy of Heth's body in a New York saloon to demonstrate her actual age before spectators paying 50 cents each.

== Showman and promotions ==
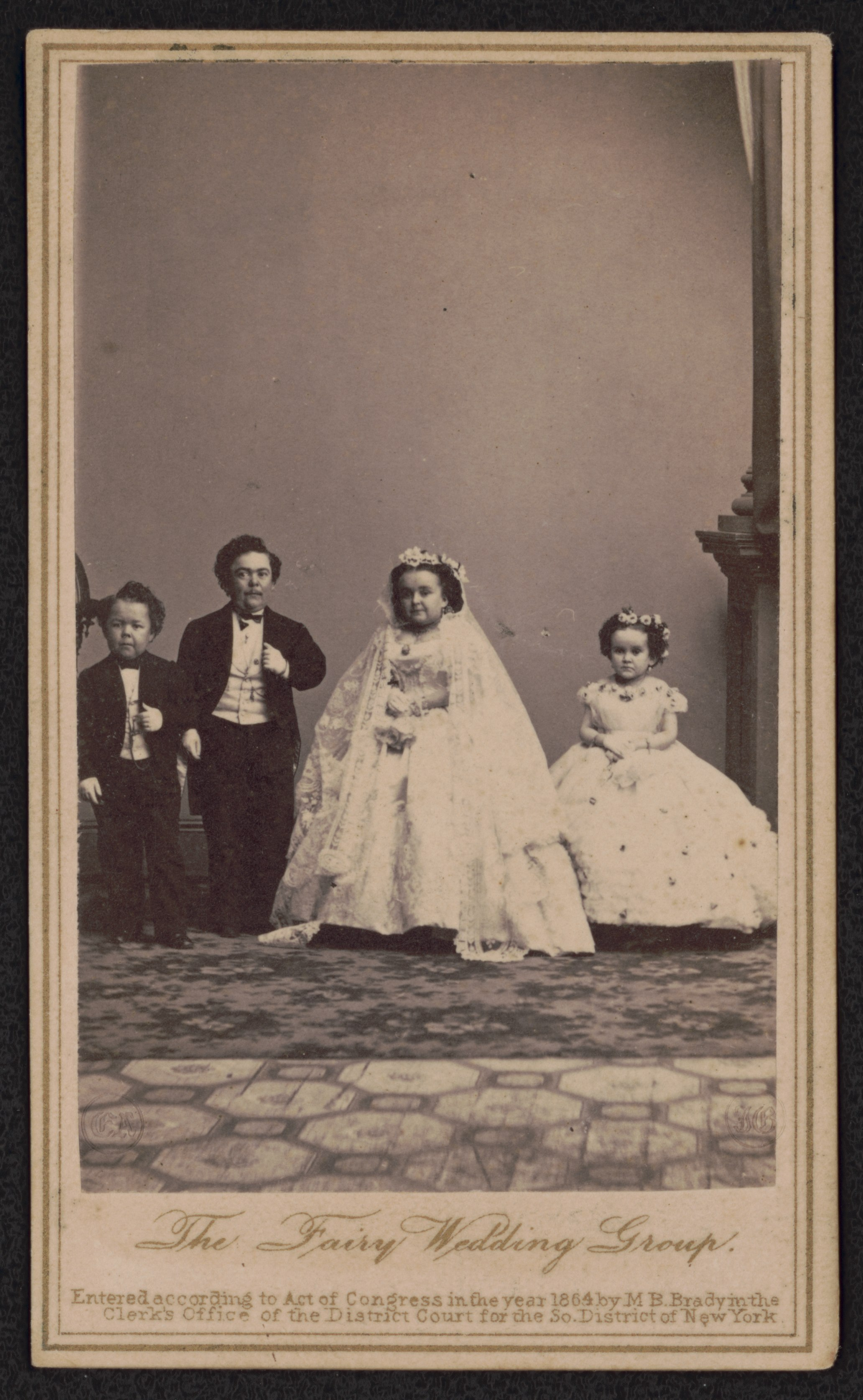
Entertainers associated with Barnum: Charles Stratton ("General Tom Thumb") and his bride Lavinia Warren, alongside her sister Minnie and George Washington Morrison Nutt ("Commodore Nutt")

Barnum had a year of mixed success with his first variety troupe, Barnum's Grand Scientific and Musical Theater, followed by the Panic of 1837 and three years of difficult circumstances. He purchased Scudder's American Museum in 1841, located at Broadway and Ann Street in Manhattan. Barnum renamed the building to Barnum's American Museum and transformed it into a hotspot for entertainment. The museum became an extremely popular showplace and was New York City's most popular attraction for 23 years.

He added a lighthouse lamp that attracted attention up and down Broadway and flags along the roof's edge that attracted attention in daytime, while giant paintings of animals between the upper windows drew attention from pedestrians. The roof was transformed to a strolling garden with a view of the city, where Barnum launched hot-air balloon rides daily. A vast series of live acts and curiosities were exhibited at the museum, including albino performers (such as the Lucasie family), "giants", little people (such as Charles Stratton), magicians, conjoined twins (such as Chang and Eng Bunker or Millie and Christine McKoy), and exotic animals.

=== Fiji mermaid and Tom Thumb ===
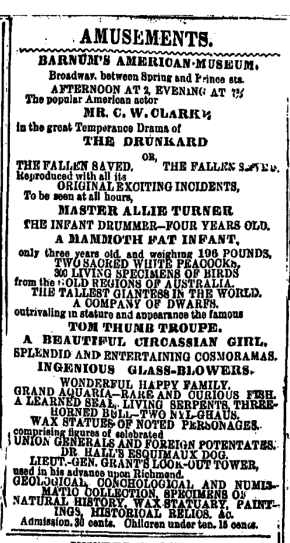
An 1866 newspaper advertisement for Barnum's American Museum located on Ann Street in Manhattan

In 1842, Barnum introduced his first major hoax: a creature with the body of a monkey and the tail of a fish known as the "Feejee" mermaid. He leased it from fellow museum owner Moses Kimball of Boston who became his friend, confidant and collaborator. Barnum justified his hoaxes by calling them advertisements to draw attention to the museum. He said, "I don't believe in duping the public, but I believe in first attracting and then pleasing them."

He followed the mermaid act by exhibiting the four-year-old actor Charles Stratton, billed as the 11-year-old General Tom Thumb. Stratton was taught to imitate famous figures such as Hercules and Napoleon.

In 1843, Barnum hired the Native American dancer Do-Hum-Me, the first of many Natives that he would present. During 1844–45, he toured with General Tom Thumb in Europe and met Queen Victoria, who was amused but saddened by Stratton, and the event was a publicity coup. It opened the door to visits with royalty throughout Europe, including the tsar of Russia, and enabled Barnum to acquire many new attractions, including automatons and other mechanical marvels. During this time, he bought other museums, including artist Rembrandt Peale's Philadelphia Museum (the nation's first major museum), and the Baltimore Museum and Gallery of Fine Arts. By late 1846, Barnum's American Museum was drawing 400,000 visitors per year.

=== Jenny Lind ===
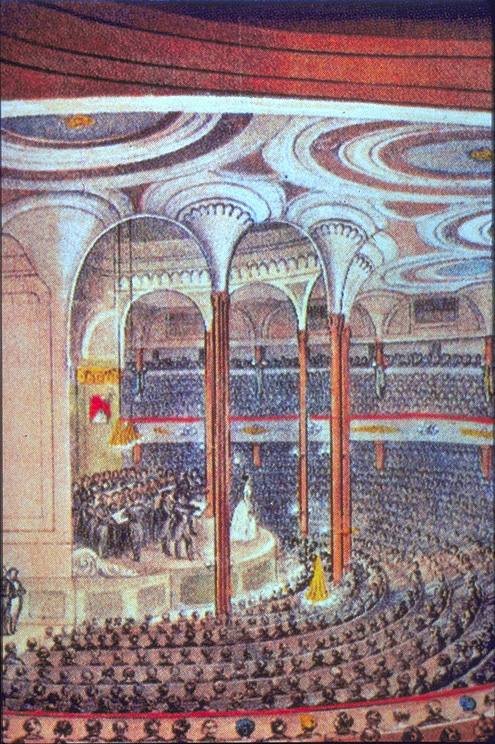
Castle Garden, New York, venue of Lind's first American concerts

Barnum became aware of the popularity of Jenny Lind, the "Swedish Nightingale", during his European tour with Tom Thumb when her career was at its height in Europe. Barnum, admittedly unmusical, had never heard Lind's voice but he offered her the chance to sing in the US at $1,000 a night for 150 nights, with all expenses paid.

Lind demanded the fee in advance, and Barnum agreed. She used the fee to raise a fund for charities, principally endowing schools for poor children in Sweden. Barnum borrowed heavily on his mansion and his museum to raise the money to pay Lind. He was still short of funds, so he persuaded a Philadelphia minister that Lind would be a positive influence on American morals, and the minister lent him the final $6,000. The contract also afforded Lind the option of withdrawing from the tour after 60 or 100 performances, paying Barnum $25,000 (~$749,884 in 2025) if she did so.

Lind and her small company sailed to the US in September 1850. She was a celebrity before she arrived, following Barnum's months of preparations. Nearly 40,000 people greeted her at the docks and another 20,000 at her hotel, and merchandise was sold. When Lind realized how much money she stood to earn from the tour, she insisted upon a new agreement, which Barnum signed on September 3, 1850. This paid Lind the original fee plus the remainder of each concert's profits after Barnum's $5,500 management fee. Lind was determined to accumulate as much money as possible for her charities.

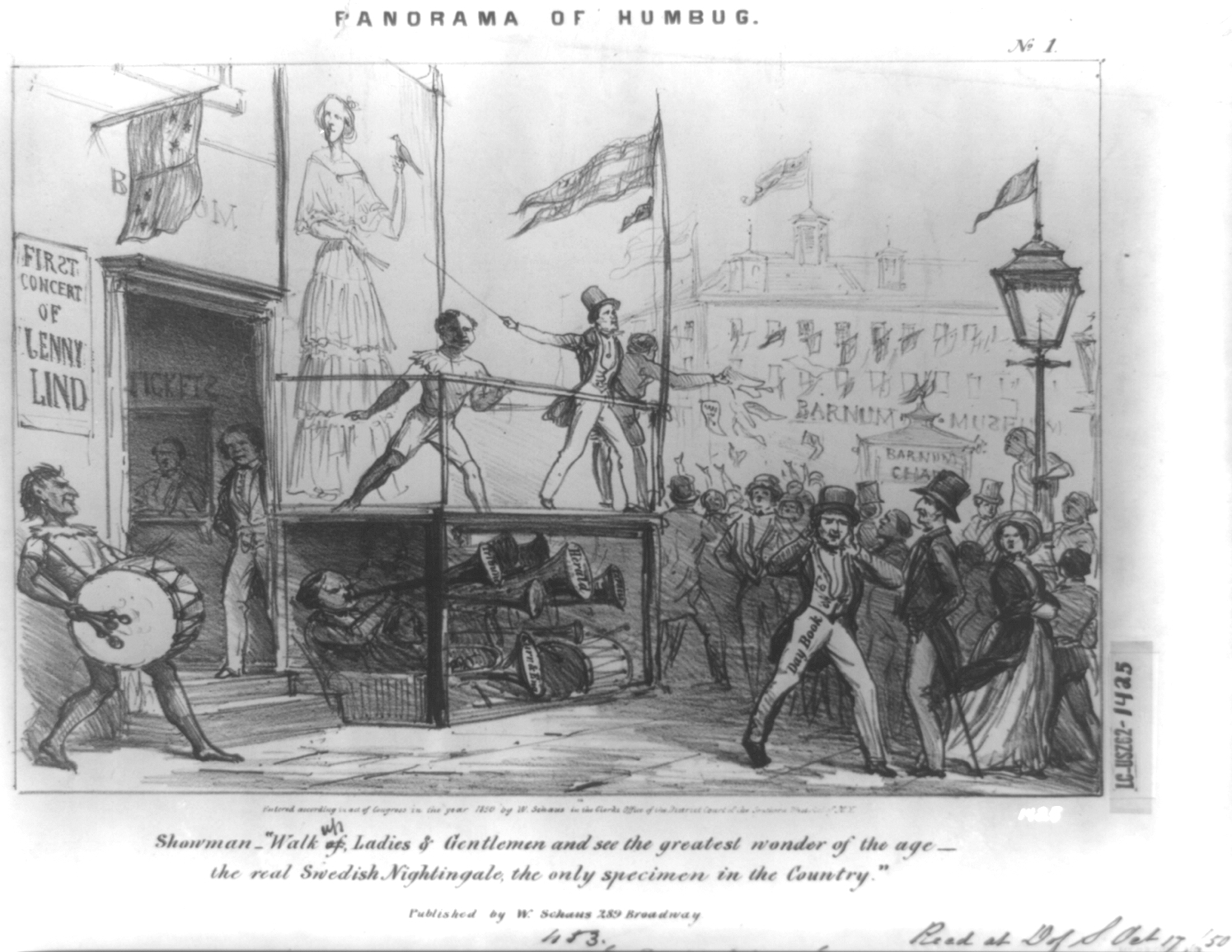
A parody of Lind's first American tour for Barnum, New York City, October 1850

The tour began with a concert at Castle Garden on September 11, 1850. It was a major success, recouping Barnum four times his investment. Washington Irving proclaimed, "She is enough to counterbalance, of herself, all the evil that the world is threatened with by the great convention of women. So God save Jenny Lind!" Tickets for some of her concerts were in such demand that Barnum sold them at auction, and public enthusiasm was so strong that the press coined the term "Lind mania". The blatant commercialism of Barnum's ticket auctions distressed Lind, and she persuaded him to reserve a substantial portion of tickets at reduced prices.

On the tour, Barnum's publicity always preceded Lind's arrival and generated enthusiasm, as he had as many as 26 journalists on his payroll. After New York, the company toured the East Coast with continued success and later traveled through the southern states and Cuba. By early 1851, Lind had become uncomfortable with Barnum's relentless marketing of the tour, and she invoked a contractual right to sever her ties with him. They parted amicably, and she continued the tour for nearly a year under her own management. Lind performed 93 concerts in the US for Barnum, earning her about $350,000, while Barnum netted at least $500,000, equivalent to $19,350,000 in 2025.

=== Diversified activities ===
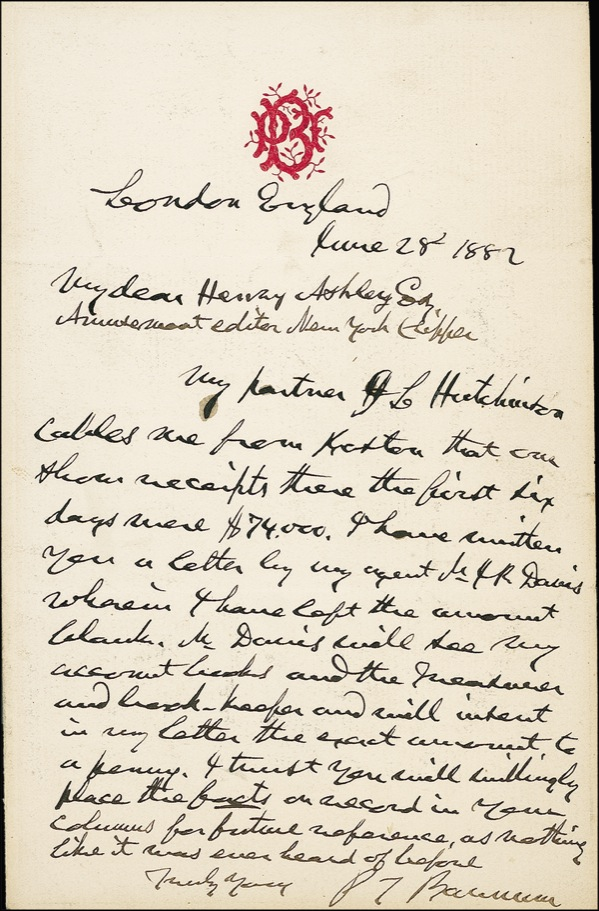
Barnum's hand-written letter of June 28, 1882, to Henry Ashley of the New York Clipper, on paper headed with Barnum's monogram.

Barnum's next challenge was to change public attitudes about the theater, which was widely regarded as a salacious enterprise. He wanted theaters to become palaces of edification and delight as respectable middle-class entertainment. He built New York City's largest and most modern theater, naming it the Moral Lecture Room. Barnum hoped that this would avoid seedy connotations, attract a family crowd and win the approval of the city's moral crusaders. He started the nation's first theatrical matinées to encourage families and to lessen the fear of crime.

The theater opened with The Drunkard, a thinly disguised temperance lecture. Barnum had become a teetotaler after returning from Europe. He followed it with melodramas, farces and historical plays performed by highly regarded actors. He edited Shakespearean plays and other works such as Uncle Tom's Cabin to render them more palatable for family audiences.

Barnum organized flower shows, beauty contests, dog shows and poultry contests, but the most popular were baby contests. In 1853 he started the pictorial weekly newspaper Illustrated News. He completed his autobiography one year later, which sold more than one million copies over the course of numerous revisions. Mark Twain loved the book, but the British Examiner thought it "trashy" and "offensive" and wrote that it inspired "nothing but sensations of disgust" and "sincere pity for the wretched man who compiled it."

In the early 1850s, Barnum began investing to develop East Bridgeport, Connecticut. He extended substantial loans to the Jerome Clock Company to lure it to move to his new industrial area, but the company went bankrupt by 1856, taking Barnum's wealth with it. This began four years of litigation and public humiliation. Ralph Waldo Emerson proclaimed that Barnum's downfall showed "the gods visible again", and other critics celebrated Barnum's public dilemma. However, Tom Thumb offered his services, as he was touring on his own, and the two began another European tour. Barnum also started a lecture tour, mostly as a temperance speaker. By 1860, he emerged from debt and built a mansion that he called Lindencroft, and he resumed ownership of his museum.

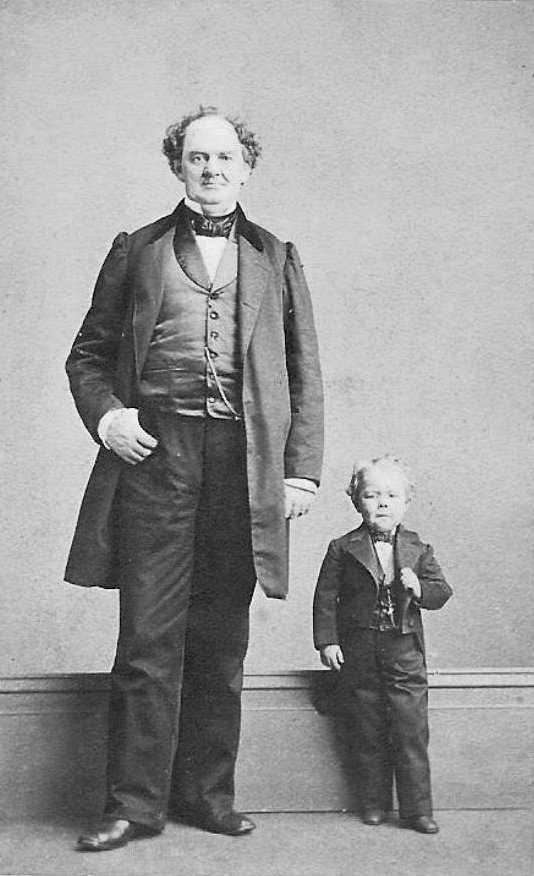
Barnum with Commodore Nutt, photograph by Charles DeForest Fredricks

Barnum created America's first aquarium and expanded the wax figure section of his museum. His "Seven Grand Salons" demonstrated the Seven Wonders of the Ancient World. The collections expanded to four buildings, and he published a museum guidebook that claimed 850,000 "curiosities". Late in 1860, Siamese twins Chang and Eng emerged from retirement and appeared at Barnum's museum for six weeks. Also in 1860, Barnum introduced Zip the Pinhead, a microcephalic black man who spoke a mysterious language created by Barnum. In 1862, Barnum discovered giantess Anna Swan and dwarf Commodore Nutt, a new Tom Thumb with whom Barnum visited President Abraham Lincoln at the White House. A year earlier, President Lincoln had visited on February 19, 1861, to which Barnum sent notice to the press for publicity.

During the Civil War, Barnum's museum drew large audiences seeking diversion from the conflict. He added pro-Union exhibits, lectures and dramas, and he demonstrated commitment to the cause. He hired Pauline Cushman in 1864, an actress who had served as a spy for the Union, to lecture about her "thrilling adventures" behind Confederate lines. Barnum's Unionist sympathies incited a Confederate sympathizer to start a fire in 1864. Barnum's American Museum burned to the ground on July 13, 1865, from a fire of unknown origin. Barnum reestablished it at another location in New York City, but this was also destroyed by fire in March 1868. The loss was too great the second time, and Barnum retired from the museum business.

== Circus ==
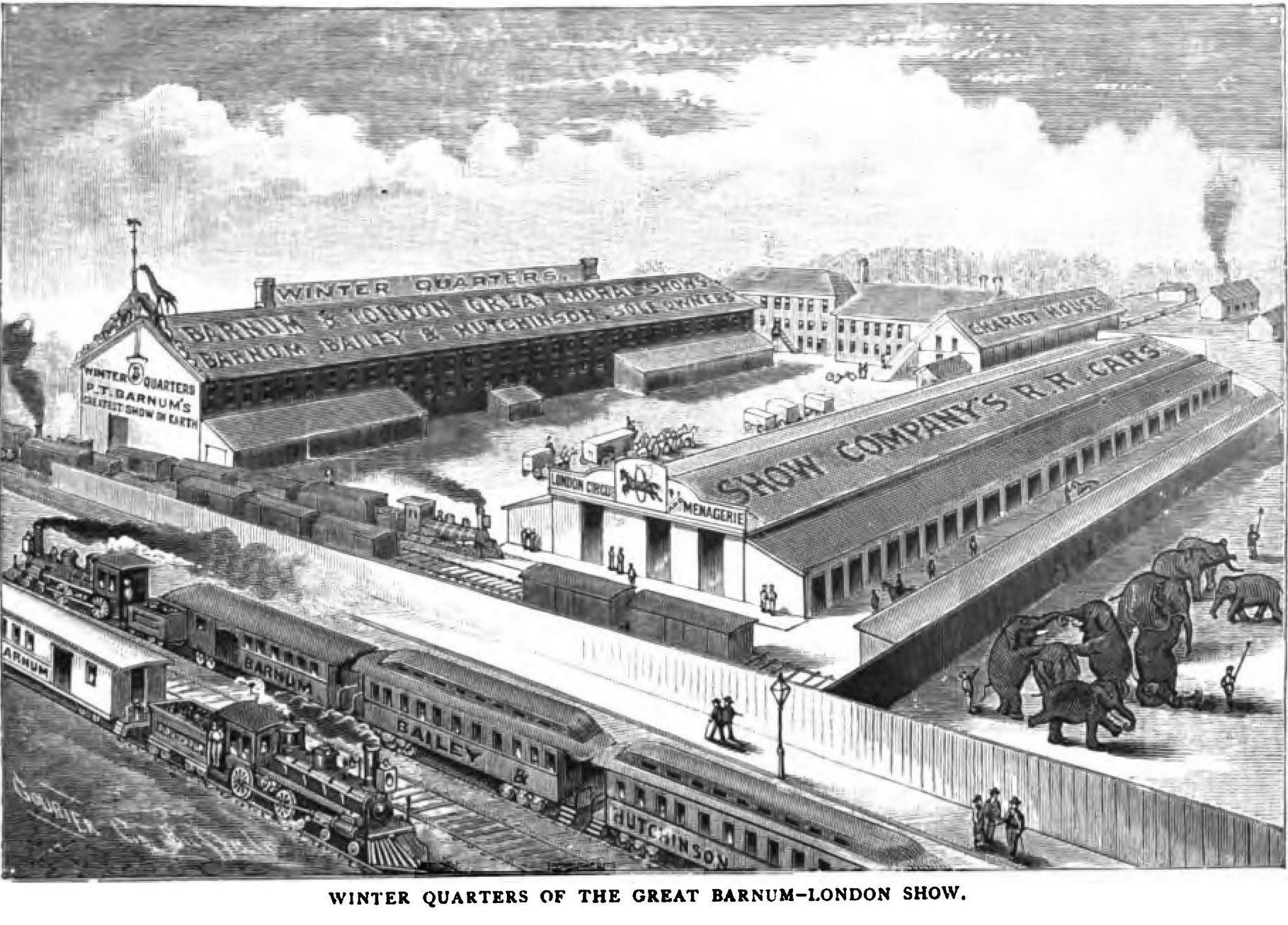
A book engraving of the winter quarters of Barnum's circus in Bridgeport, Connecticut

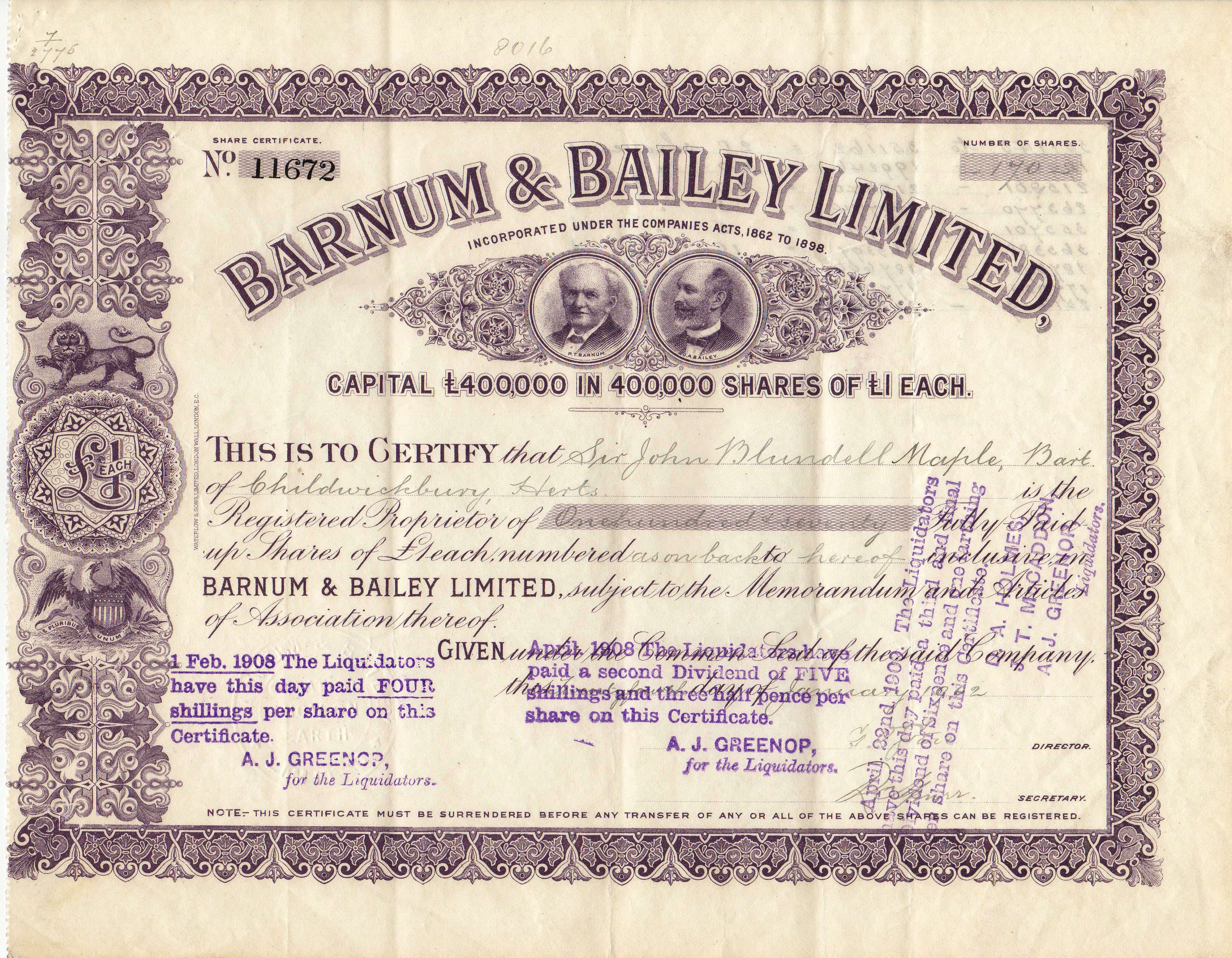
A share of Barnum and Bailey Ltd, issued January 24, 1902

Barnum did not enter the circus business until he was 60 years old. He established "P. T. Barnum's Grand Traveling Museum, Menagerie, Caravan & Hippodrome" in Delavan, Wisconsin in 1870 with William Cameron Coup. It was a traveling circus, menagerie and museum of "freaks" that assumed various names: "P. T. Barnum's Travelling World's Fair, Great Roman Hippodrome and Greatest Show on Earth", and "P. T. Barnum's Greatest Show on Earth, and the Great London Circus, Sanger's Royal British Menagerie and the Grand International Allied Shows United" after an 1881 merger with James Bailey and James L. Hutchinson, soon shortened to "Barnum & Bailey's". This was the first circus to display three rings.

The show's first primary attraction was Jumbo, an African elephant that Barnum purchased in 1882 from the London Zoo. The Barnum and Bailey Circus still contained acts similar to his Traveling Menagerie, including acrobats, freak shows and General Tom Thumb. Barnum persisted in growing the circus in spite of more fires, train disasters and other setbacks, and he was aided by circus professionals who ran the daily operations. He and Bailey parted ways in 1885, but they rejoined in 1888 with the "Barnum & Bailey Greatest Show on Earth", later the Barnum & Bailey Circus, which toured the world.

Barnum was among the first circus owners to move his circus by train, a suggestion by Bailey and other business partners, and probably the first to buy his own train. He became known as the "Shakespeare of Advertising" because of his innovative and impressive ideas. In this new business venture, Barnum leaned more on the advice of Bailey and other business partners, who were young enough to be his sons.

== Author and debunker ==
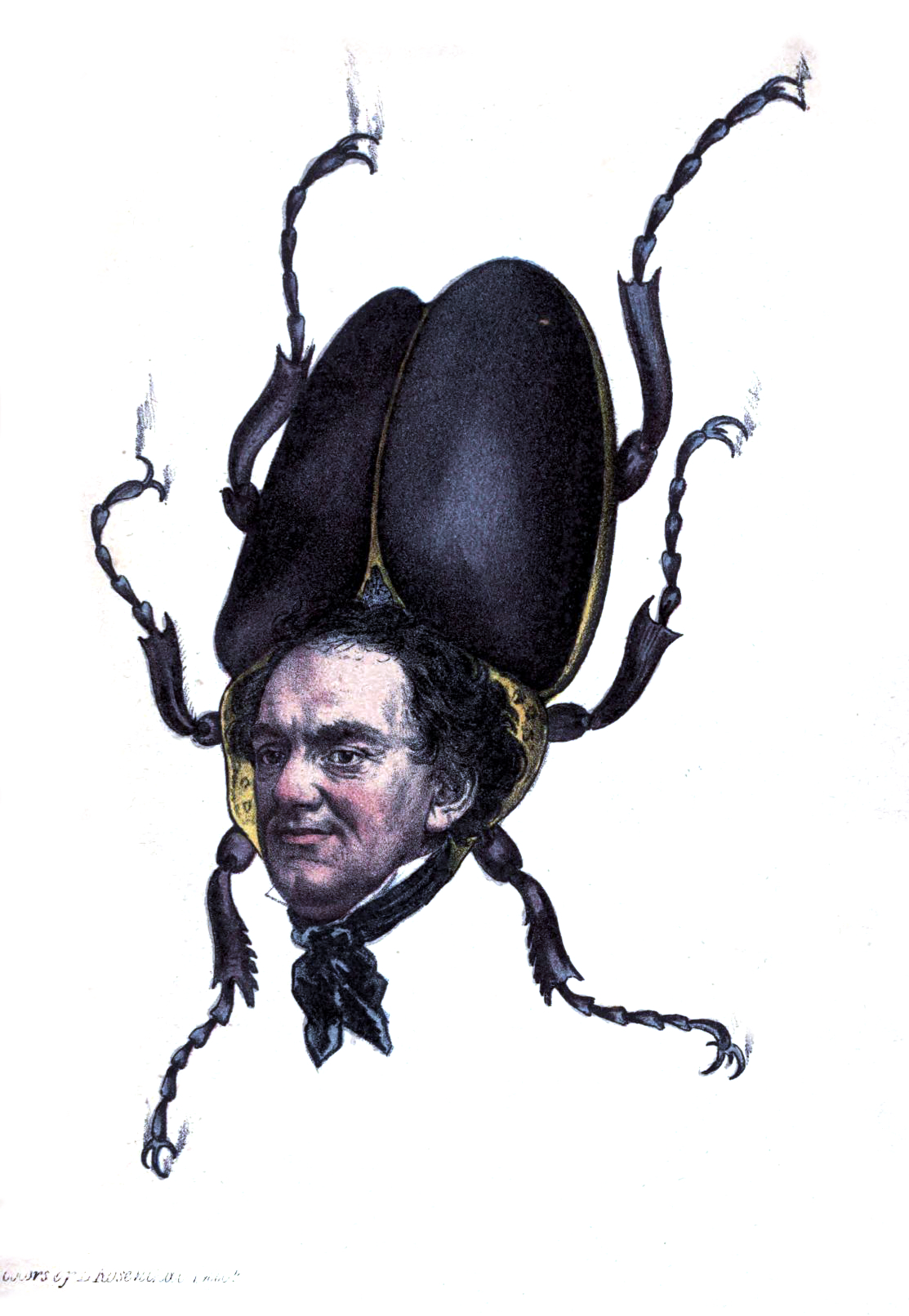
"Hum-Bug", a cartoon by H. L. Stephens (1851)

Barnum wrote several books, including Life of P. T. Barnum (1855), The Humbugs of the World (1865), Struggles and Triumphs (1869), Forest and Jungle, or, Thrilling Adventures in All Quarters of the Globe and The Art of Money-Getting (1880).

Barnum was often called the Prince of Humbugs and felt that entertainers and vendors perpetrating hoaxes (or "humbugs") in promotional material were justified if the public received value in return. However, he was contemptuous of those who accrued money through fraud, especially the spiritualist mediums popular in his day. He testified against noted "spirit photographer" William H. Mumler in his trial for fraud, and he exposed the tricks employed by mediums to cheat the bereaved. In The Humbugs of the World, Barnum offered $500 (equivalent to $10,516 in 2025) to any medium who could prove the power to communicate with the dead.

The Barnum effect are high accuracy ratings that supposedly are tailored specifically for a person, but in fact are vague and general enough to apply to a broad range of people, named by psychologist Paul E. Meehl .

== Role in politics ==
Barnum was significantly involved in politics. He mainly focused on race, slavery and sectionalism in the period preceding the American Civil War. He opposed the Kansas–Nebraska Act of 1854, which supported slavery, and left the Democratic Party because it had endorsed slavery. Barnum joined the new anti-slavery Republican Party.

Barnum claimed that "politics were always distasteful to me", but he was elected to the Connecticut General Assembly in 1865 as a Republican representing Fairfield. He hired spies to acquire insider information on the New York and New Haven Railroad lines and exposed a secret that would raise fares by 20 percent. He said during the ratification of the Thirteenth Amendment to the United States Constitution: "A human soul, 'that God has created and Christ died for,' is not to be trifled with. It may tenant the body of a Chinaman, a Turk, an Arab or a Hottentot—it is still an immortal spirit." He acknowledged that he had owned slaves when he lived in the South: "I whipped my slaves. I ought to have been whipped a thousand times for this myself. But then I was a Democrat—one of those nondescript Democrats, who are Northern men with Southern principles."

Barnum was elected for the next four Connecticut legislature sessions and succeeded senator Orris S. Ferry. He was the legislative sponsor of an 1879 law that prohibited the use of "any drug, medicinal article or instrument for the purpose of preventing conception" and criminalized acting as an accessory to the use of contraception. This law remained in effect in Connecticut until it was overturned in 1965 by the U.S. Supreme Court in its Griswold v. Connecticut decision.

Barnum campaigned for the U.S. Congress in 1867 and lost to his third cousin William Henry Barnum. In 1875, he served as mayor of Bridgeport, Connecticut to improve the water supply, bring gas lighting to streets and enforce liquor and prostitution laws. He was instrumental in the inception of Bridgeport Hospital, founded in 1878, and was its first president.

== Profitable philanthropy ==
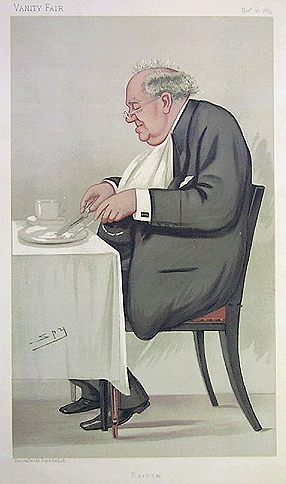
A caricature of an elderly Barnum in the London magazine Vanity Fair, November 1888

Barnum enjoyed what he publicly dubbed "profitable philanthropy", saying: "If by improving and beautifying our city Bridgeport, Connecticut, and adding to the pleasure and prosperity of my neighbors, [and] I can do so at a profit, the incentive to 'good works' will be twice as strong as if it were otherwise." He was appointed to the board of trustees of Tufts University prior to its founding. He extended several significant contributions to the school, including a gift of $50,000, equivalent to $1,727,679 in 2025, in 1883 to establish a museum, later known as Barnum Museum of Natural History, and hall for the department of natural history. Tufts made Jumbo the Elephant the school's mascot. Tufts students are known as Jumbos.

== Personal life and death ==
On November 8, 1829, when he was 19 years old, Barnum married Charity Hallett, and they had four children: Caroline Cornelia (1833–1911), Helen Maria (1840–1915), Frances Irena (1842–1844) and Pauline Taylor (1846–1877). His wife died on November 19, 1873. In 1874, when Barnum was 64 years old, he married Nancy Fish, the 24 year old daughter of his close friend John Fish.

Barnum died from a stroke at home in 1891 at the age of 80. He is buried in Mountain Grove Cemetery in Bridgeport, Connecticut, a cemetery that he designed.

== Legacy ==
Barnum built four mansions in Bridgeport, Connecticut: Iranistan, Lindencroft, Waldemere and Marina. Iranistan was the most notable, a Moorish Revival architecture designed by Leopold Eidlitz with domes, spires and lacy fretwork inspired by the Royal Pavilion in Brighton, England. It was built in 1848 but it was destroyed by fire in 1857. The Marina was demolished by the University of Bridgeport in 1964 in order to build a cafeteria.

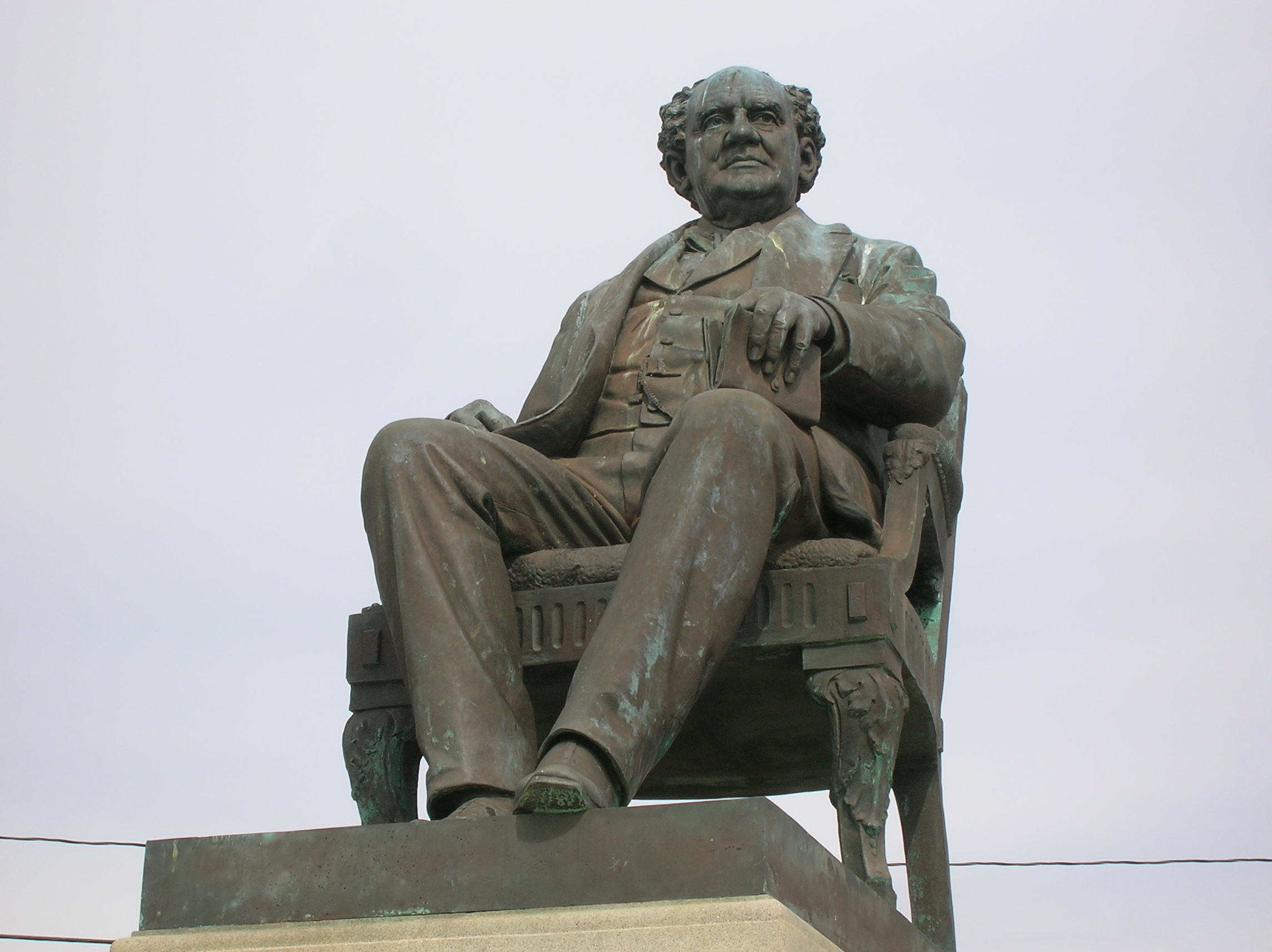
P. T. Barnum, an 1887 sculpture by Thomas Ball, Seaside Park, Bridgeport, Connecticut

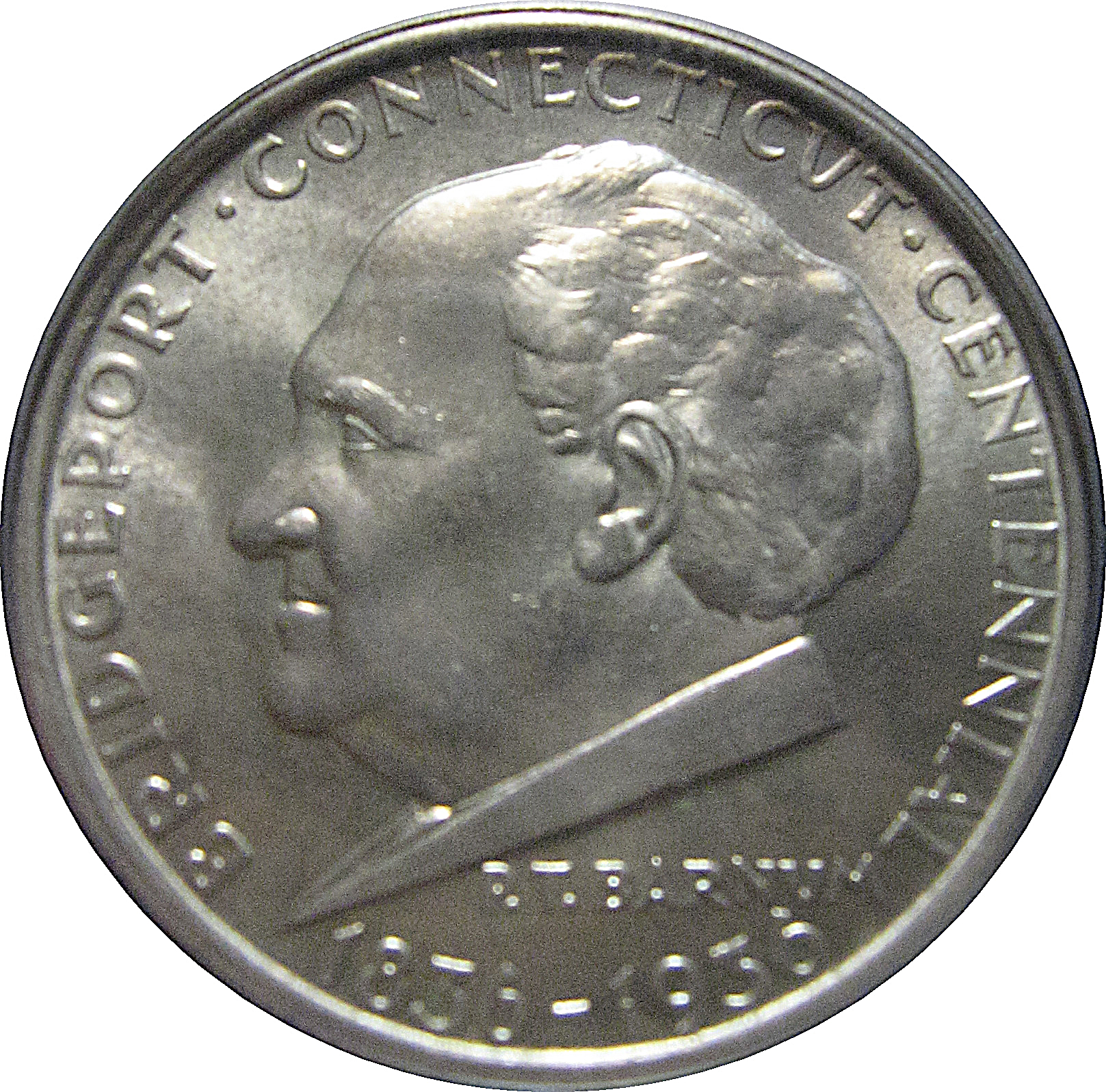
Obverse of the 1936 commemorative Bridgeport Centennial half dollar

At his death, critics praised Barnum for his philanthropy and called him an icon of American spirit and ingenuity. He asked the Evening Sun to print his obituary just prior to his death so that he might read it. On April 7, 1891, Barnum asked about the box-office receipts for the day, and a few hours later, he died.

In 1893, a statue in Barnum's honor was erected by his former partners James Bailey, James A. Hutchinson and W. W. Cole at Seaside Park in Bridgeport. Barnum had donated the land for the park in 1865. His circus was sold to Ringling Brothers on July 8, 1907, for $400,000, equivalent to $13,821,429 in 2025. The Ringling Brothers and Barnum & Bailey circuses ran separately until they merged in 1919, forming the Ringling Bros. and Barnum & Bailey Circus.

The United States Mint issued a commemorative coin in 1936 for Bridgeport's centennial celebration with Barnum's portrait for the obverse. Cartoonist Walt Kelly, a Bridgeport native, named a character in Barnum's honor in his Pogo comic strip. An ongoing annual multi-week Barnum Festival has been held since 1949 in Bridgeport. The Bethel Historical Society commissioned a life-sized sculpture to honor the 200th anniversary of his birth, created by local resident David Gesualdi and placed outside the public library. The statue was dedicated in September 2010.

In 1883, Barnum cofounded, with Charles E. Tooker, the Bridgeport & Port Jefferson Steamboat Company, which continues to operate across Long Island Sound between Port Jefferson, New York and Bridgeport. The company owns and operates three vessels, one of which is named MV PT Barnum. The Barnum Museum in Bridgeport houses many of his oddities and curiosities.

== In popular culture ==
=== Films and television ===
- A Lady's Morals (1930) – played by Wallace Beery
- Jenny Lind (1932) – played by André Berley
- The Mighty Barnum (1934) – played again by Wallace Beery
- Jules Verne's Rocket to the Moon (1967) – played by Burl Ives
- Barnum! (1986) – played by Michael Crawford; a filmed version of the Broadway musical (see below), filmed in London
- Barnum (1986) – played by Burt Lancaster; made-for-TV movie
- P.T. Barnum (1999) – played by Beau Bridges; made-for-TV movie
- Gangs of New York (2002) – played by Roger Ashton-Griffiths
- The Greatest Showman (2017) – a pop musical loosely based around Barnum and his circus. Hugh Jackman plays Barnum and coproduced the film
- DC's Legends of Tomorrow (2018) – Billy Zane plays Barnum in season 3, episode 2 "Freakshow"
- I Didn't See You There (2022) – a disabled filmmaker from Barnum's hometown of Bethel meditates on the ableist legacy of the freak show

=== Theater ===
- Barnum (1980) – Broadway musical based on Barnum's life, starring Jim Dale
- The Greatest Showman (2026) – a stage musical based on the 2017 film

=== Books ===
- The Great and Only Barnum; the Tremendous, Stupendous Life of Showman P. T. Barnum

=== Music ===
- "U.S. Blues" – a song from the album From the Mars Hotel by the Grateful Dead
- "Killer Clowns" – a song from the EP Killer Clowns From Outer Space by The Dickies makes reference to P.T. Barnum and his associate James Anthony Bailey, as well as the often misattributed quote: "there's a sucker born every minute you know" ("There's one born every minute, don't you know?").
- On their The Origin of the Feces album (1992), Type O Negative listed P.T. Barnum as producer.
- P.T. Barnum was featured in the album cover for Dangerous by Michael Jackson (1991)

== Publications ==
- The Life of P. T. Barnum: Written by Himself. Originally published New York: Redfield, 1855. Reprint: Urbana: University of Illinois Press, 2000. ISBN 0-252-06902-1.
- Struggles and Triumphs, or Forty Years' Recollections of P. T. Barnum. Originally published 1869. Reprint: Whitefish, MT: Kessinger, 2003. ISBN 0-7661-5556-0 (Part 1) and ISBN 0-7661-5557-9 (Part 2). 1882 edition at the Internet Archive.
- Art of Money Getting, or, Golden Rules for Making Money. Originally published 1880. Reprint: Bedford, MA: Applewood, 1999. ISBN 1-55709-494-2.
- The Wild Beasts, Birds, and Reptiles of the World: The Story of Their Capture. Pub. 1888, R. S. Peale & Company, Chicago.
- Why I Am a Universalist. Originally published 1890. Reprint: Kessinger Pub Co. ISBN 1-4286-2657-3.

== See also ==
- Barnum effect
- Barnum's Aquarial Gardens, Boston, Massachusetts (1862–1863)
- John Genin
- Cardiff Giant
- Colonel Routh Goshen
- Carl Hagenbeck
- Forest King
- Human zoo
- Fedor Jeftichew
- Nellie Keeler
- Isaac W. Sprague
- Wild Men of Borneo
- Lucia Zarate
- Oong Ar-Showe, who worked as an interpreter for Barnum
- Zip the Pinhead
