= Nancy Fish =

English socialite (1850–1927)

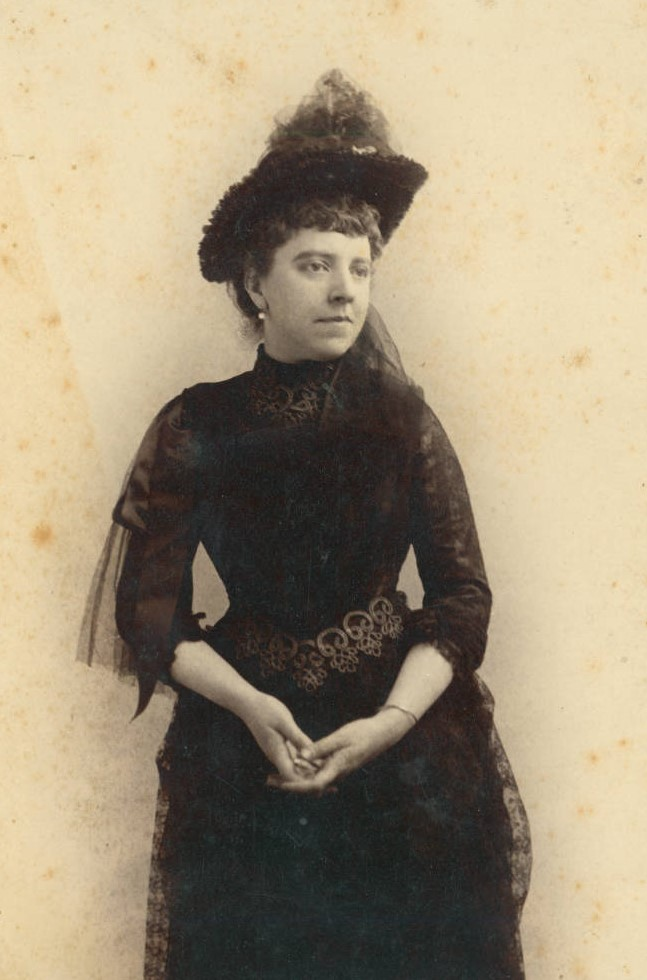
- Nancy Fish Barnum in 1888
- Born: 22 April 1850; Blackburn, Lancashire, England
- Died: 23 June 1927 (aged 77); Paris, France
- Other names: Nancy Fish Barnum Callias D'Orengiani
- Spouses: P. T. Barnum (m. 1874; died 1891) Demetrius Callias (m. 1895; died 1896) Lucien D'Alexandry D'Orengiani (m. 1898; died 1919)

Nancy Fish Barnum Callias D'Orengiani, Baroness (née Fish; 22 April 1850 – 23 June 1927) was an English socialite, daughter of a successful cotton miller and the second wife of P. T. Barnum, 40 years her senior. After the death of Barnum's first wife in 1873, they married the following year in both London and New York City. After his death in 1891, he left her a large annuity.

Four years later, after an accidental meeting in Egypt, Fish married Demetrius Callias Bey, an Ottoman diplomat, nobleman and businessman of Greek descent. Their marriage in New York City was sensationalised in the American press and ended at Callias's 1896 death.

Two years later, Fish entered a mutually beneficial business-like marriage with the Baron Lucien D'Alexandry D'Orengiani, a French nobleman. She lived out the rest of her life in Europe as a baroness and died in 1927. She was cremated and buried next to her second husband. A posthumous biography was published by The New Yorker magazine.

== Early life ==
Nancy Fish was born in Blackburn, Lancashire on 22 April 1850 to Martha (née Shaw) and John Fish, a Manchester cotton mill owner. John Fish credited his own business success to reading the autobiography of the successful businessman P. T. Barnum. In 1858, her father met Barnum at a lecture at the Free Trade Hall in Manchester and thanked him for the inspiration he had provided. The two subsequently became close friends; John Fish named a pair of his engines "Barnum" and "Charity" (after Barnum's wife) and threw a party for General Tom Thumb when he was exhibiting in England; Barnum dedicated a chapter of his autobiography to John Fish. Due to her father's business success, by 1871 Nancy Fish and her family had moved to a large house in the relatively upmarket North Meols, near Southport, Lancashire. Around this time, Fish began writing letters to Barnum.

== Marriage to Barnum ==
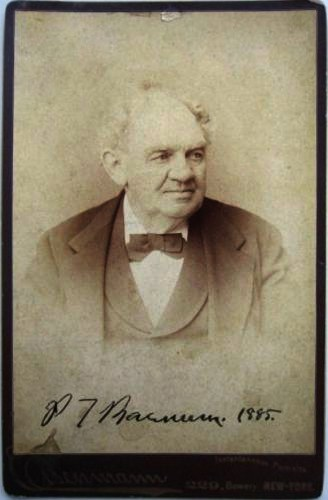
P. T. Barnum, pictured in 1885, was Fish's first husband.

Fish accompanied Barnum during his European tours and was in constant communication with him through writing. It was rumoured that they were already in a relationship prior to the death of Barnum's first wife Charity on 19 November 1873. Indeed, upon hearing of Charity's death, Barnum travelled to Southport to be with Fish and her father John, and did not attend his wife's funeral. Fish married Barnum twice in 1874, at the Strand in London on 14 February and then at a Greek Orthodox church in New York City on 15 September in front of a large crowd. They honeymooned at the Windsor Hotel in New York City. She was 40 years his junior and was described in the American press as "a young pretty Lancashire lass".

The marriage was reported to be a happy one, with Barnum's children from his first marriage being devoted to their new stepmother, despite their similar ages. Together the couple planned, built and furnished a new house in Bridgeport, Connecticut called Marina. Barnum died on 7 April 1891, leaving his widow $100,000 ($3.2 million in 2024 dollars), their home Marina, and an annuity of $40,000 ($1.3 million in 2024 dollars). The large size of the legacy displeased Barnum's children. As a widow, she applied for and received an American passport and travelled Europe before returning to the United States. On 4 July 1893, she unveiled the statue of her late husband at Seaside Park in Bridgeport.

Fish does not appear as a character in the 2017 Barnum-inspired musical film The Greatest Showman, despite in reality being his wife during some of the film's events.

== Marriage to Callias ==
In 1894, Fish visited Egypt where she was presented with a mummy that was being donated to the Scientific Society in Bridgeport. It was on this trip that she met Demetrius Callias Bey, an Ottoman diplomat, nobleman and olive industry businessman of Greek descent. They had supposedly met when she fell from the Great Pyramid and was caught by Callias. The same year, she put Marina on the market and left Connecticut.

Fish married Callias on 8 August 1895 at Annunciation Greek Orthodox Church in New York City, and only a few close friends knew of the ceremony. After their wedding ceremony they sailed to Paris and travelled Europe before arriving at Callias's estates on the island of Melita. Fish soon learned that Callias, who spoke little English, had exaggerated his wealth and, upon her return to New York City in March 1896, there were rumours that the couple would separate. However, this was denied by her close relatives. Callias died of liver failure on 22 September 1896 while Fish was in the United States, after which she sailed to Europe and never returned.

== Later life ==
After the death of her second husband, Fish moved to Paris where she lived in an apartment near the Arc de Triomphe. In 1898, she married a French nobleman, Lucien Hyppolyte Ferdinand Marie, Baron d'Alexandry d'Orengiani. The marriage was mutually beneficial and business-like, the baron was able to clear his debts with some of Fish's money, and Fish gained the title of baroness and societal connections. As a baroness Fish kept residences in Paris, Aix-les-Bains and Menton. She socialised with American expatriates, French nobility, members of P. T. Barnum's family, and European royals including Empress Eugénie. Her French husband died in 1919, by which point he and Fish were living separately, however this did not stop her from being the lead mourner at his funeral.

== Death ==
Fish died in Paris on 23 June 1927, possibly due to complications from a series of strokes she suffered eighteen months earlier. News of her death was telegraphed to Bridgeport, Connecticut, and reported in The New York Times. She was cremated and then buried next to her second husband in the English Square of Grand Jas cemetery in Cannes, Provence-Alpes-Côte d'Azur, France.

A posthumous biography was published in The New Yorker magazine in April 1936. She was portrayed by Kirsten Bishop in the 1986 television film Barnum, a musical biography of P.T. Barnum.
