= Lucasie Family =

Family with albinism who toured with P.T. Barnum

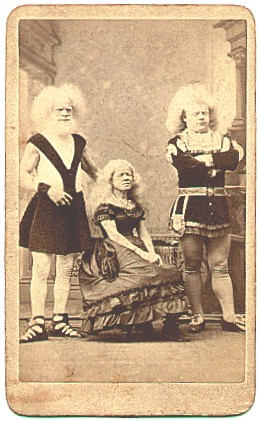
- Rudolph, Antiana and Joseph Lucasie

The Lucasie Family were a family with albinism who worked at P. T. Barnum's American Museum who were called "one of his most popular exhibits" by the New York Times.

== Early lives ==
Rudolph Lucasie was born in Madagascar to French parents in 1833 and was married to his wife Antiana (sometimes called Antoinette) who was born in Venice in 1834. They had one child, Joseph Rudolph Lucasie, who was born in Germany in 1850.

Mary Brett has written that there was a second child with albinism, one who was female, who would perform with them to "increase the appeal of the act" but that she was unrelated. Other sources claim that there was a sister who was either older or younger than Joseph but she was not named.

== Career ==
When they met P. T. Barnum they were living in Amsterdam and they moved to New York in 1858 to appear in his museum as one of the original "exhibitions."

The family toured the US and Canada, appearing in Montréal where they were said to speak "perfect English and French." Joseph learned to play the violin as part of the act and was both talented and popular. The Lucasies were paid well relative to other non-Barnum sideshow work, but there was tension between them and Barnum. Barnum called them "disagreeable" and threatened their manager, Dr. Oscar Kohn, that he would "put them in jail" if things did not improve. The Lucasies left New York when the original museum burned down in 1865.

The Lucasies also performed with W. W. Coles, and for the Kansas City Museum. The family was living in Omaha, Nebraska, at the 1880 census where their employer was listed as Coles Circus. By 1883 a St. Louis, Missouri directory showed Joseph Lucasie living with Landon Middlecoff, a giant who was also a sideshow performer. The two operated a saloon there in 1883.

Joseph continued to tour as "the Madagascar violinist" with the Lemon Brothers and others where mention was only sometimes made of his albinism. By 1902 he was listed solo in the Kansas City, Missouri business directory as an actor. In 1906 he was touring with vaudeville promoter Chas. Philson.

== Marketing and public image ==
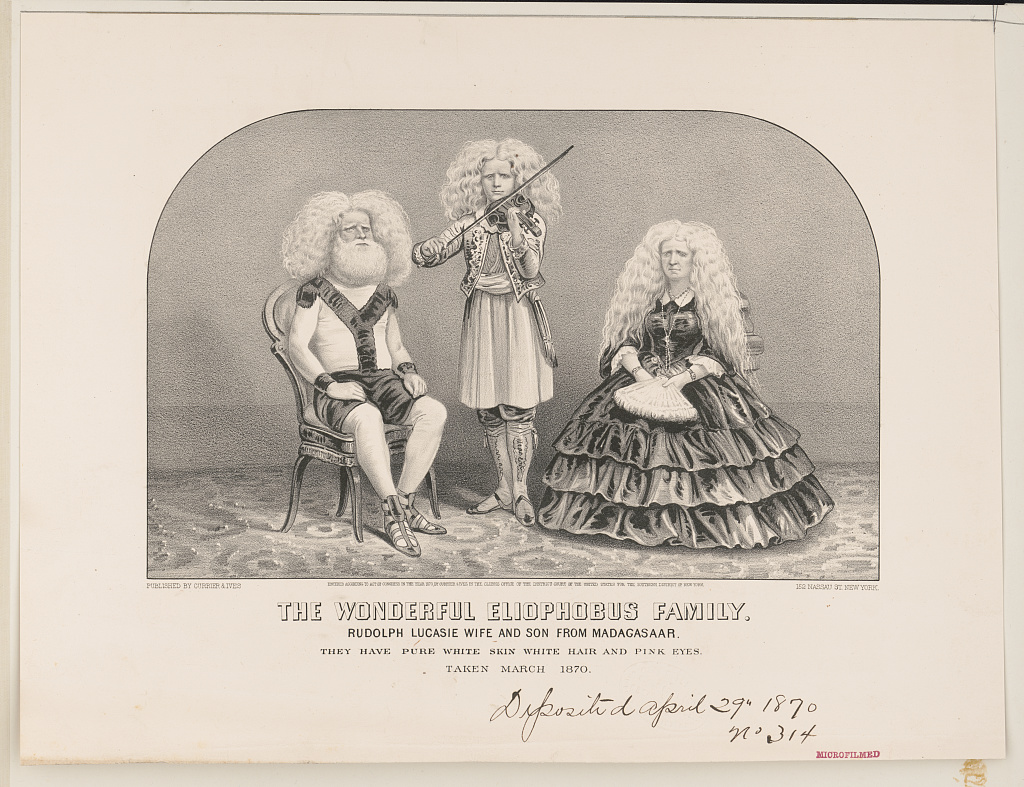
The Wonderful Eliophobus Family, a lithograph depicting Rudolph Lucasie, his wife, and their son, published in 1870.

The Lucasie Family were heavily promoted by showman P. T. Barnum after joining Barnum's American Museum in 1858, and were later described by The New York Times as "one of his most popular exhibits".

Barnum published editions of History of Rudolph Lucasie in 1860 and 1869, revising the family's published background in successive editions. The first pamphlet described them as "white Negroes" from Madagascar born to parents of African descent, while the later edition instead said they were "white Moors" born to European parents in Madagascar. Despite the revision, the earlier account continued to be repeated into the 1920s, including by Ripley's Believe It or Not!, and was later repeated in books about Barnum.

During the early 1860s, the American printmaking firm Currier & Ives produced four colour lithographs of the family, describing them as "The Wonderful Albino Family" and "The Wonderful Eliophobus Family". The invented word "Eliophobus", meaning "afraid of the sun", reflected contemporary beliefs about people with albinism. Mathew Brady and other photographers also photographed the family, and numerous cabinet cards and carte de visites were produced and sold throughout North America.

== Death ==
Rudolph and Antiana died in 1898. Joseph Lucasie died of dropsy in 1909 in Kansas City.

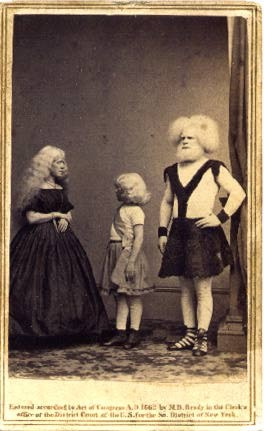
Lucasie Family cabinet card

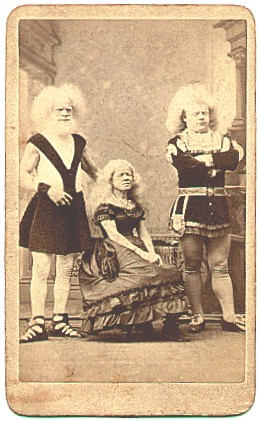
Lucasie Family cabinet card

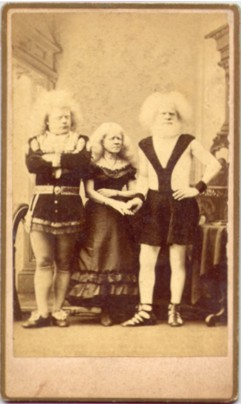
Lucasie Family cabinet card

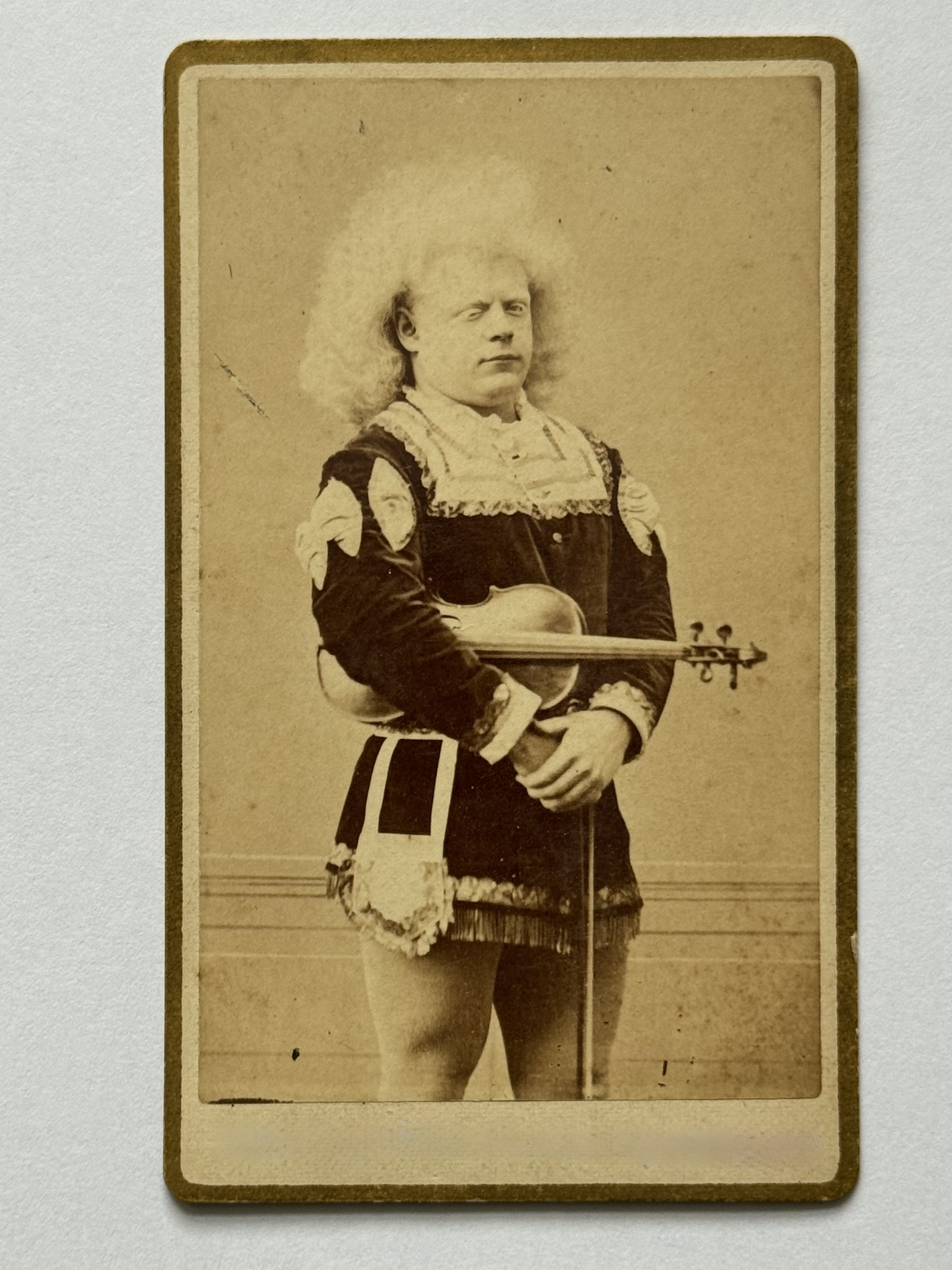
Joseph Lucasie cabinet card

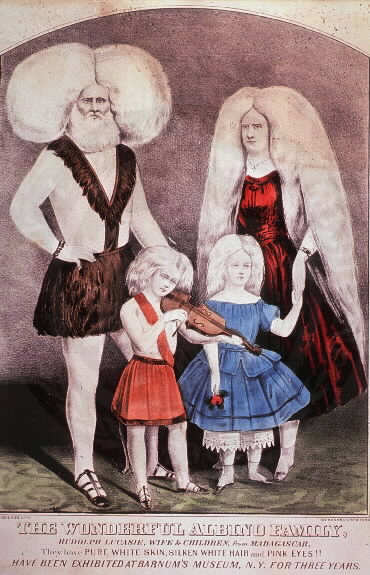
Currier & Ives lithograph of Lucasie Family

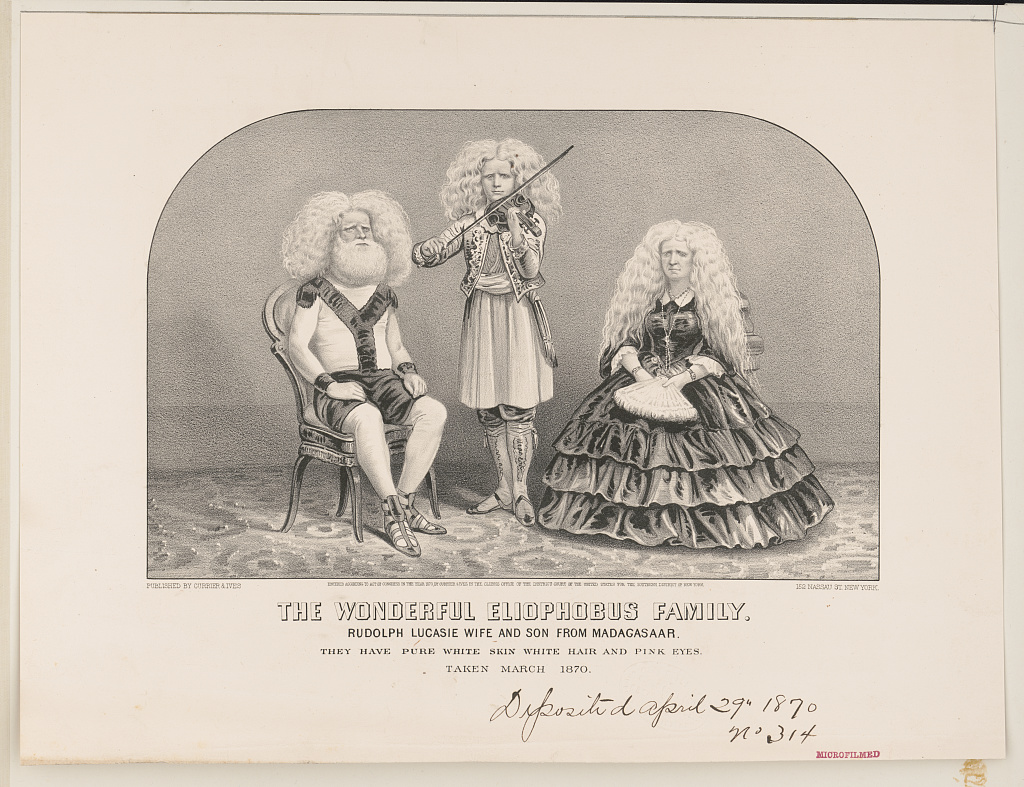
Currier & Ives lithograph of Lucasie Family

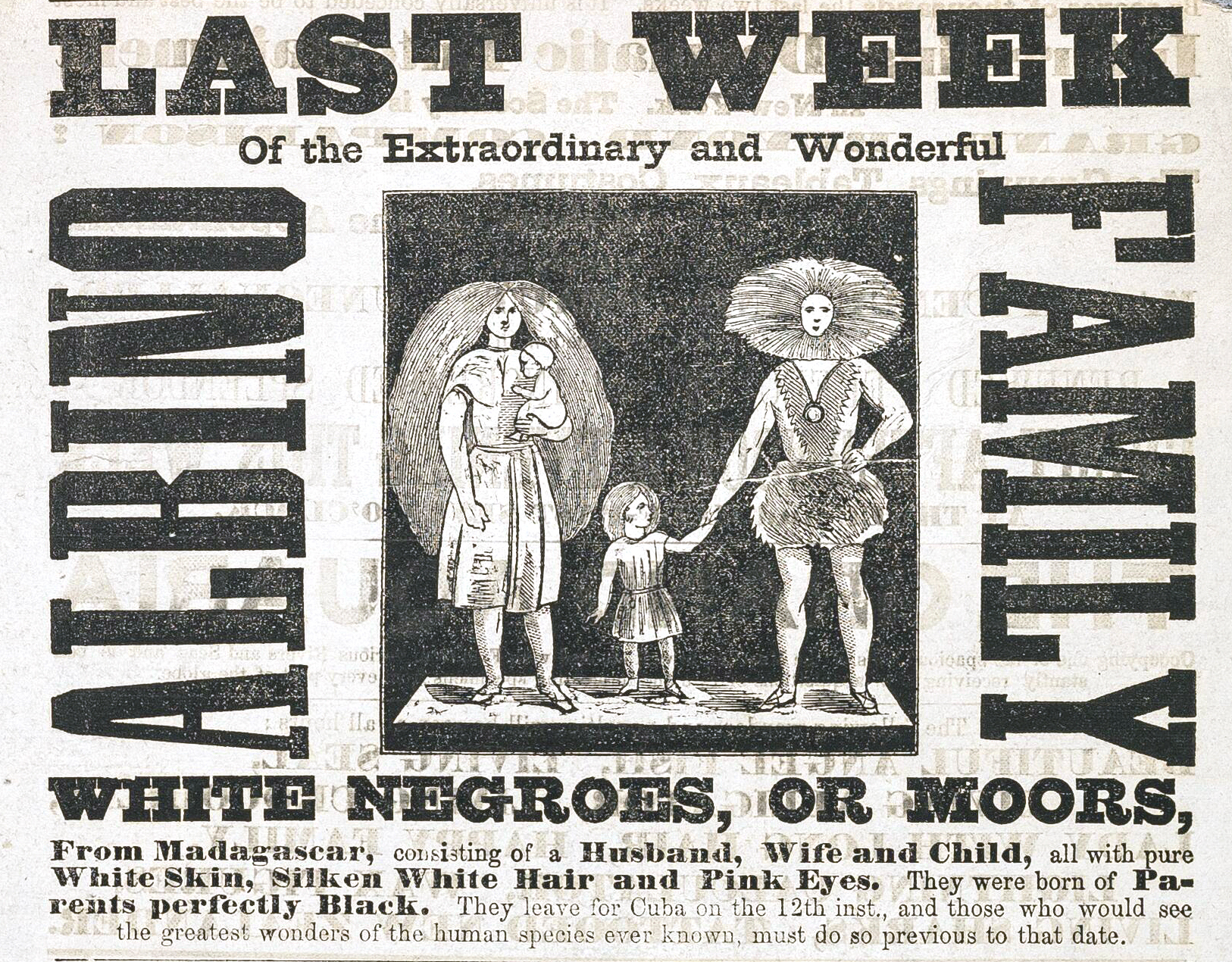
Barnum 1860 broadside highlighting Lucasie Family
