= Auctorum =

Term in botany and zoology scholarship

Auctorum indicates that a name in botany and zoology is used in the sense of subsequent authors, and not in the sense as established by the original author. Its etymology derives from the Latin word for of authors (genitive plural), and is abbreviated auct. or auctt.

Some species names have been used twice for different species so the author of the name needs to be identified. For example "Leucospermum bolusii auct. Gandoger" for the species that was named as such by Gandoger. It is often used in conjunction with nec or non to indicate a misapplied name, e.g. "Leucospermum bolusii auct. non Gandoger" would mean the species not named by Gandoger.

It may be qualified to indicate the number of authors, e.g. auctorum multorum (abbreviated auct. mult.), Latin for of many authors, indicating that many subsequent authors used a name in a different sense to the original author, and also by non to give auctorum non (auct. non), to indicate that a following author is not the author of the species.

== Examples ==
Leucospermum bolusii is a name that was used twice for different species. The first time was by Michel Gandoger in 1901. Since this name was validly published, used for a species that did not already have a name and the name had not already been used for another species, it is the correct name. The list of synonyms of Leucospermum cordifolium includes Leucospermum bolusii described by Edwin Percy Phillips in 1910. This name however was already taken. So, Leucospermum bolusii E.Phillips, 1910 is a later homonym of Leucospermum bolusii Gandoger, 1901. If the name Leucospermum bolusii is used in a later publication, the botanical author needs to make clear which one is meant, and which one isn’t. Hence, the species of 1901 would be Leucospermum bolusii auct. Gandoger, while the synonym of Leucospermum cordifolium, is Leucospermum bolusii E.Phillips, 1910 auct. non Gandoger.

The Flora Europaea gives one of the synonyms of Cistus clusii as "C. libanotis auct. mult., non L.", meaning that many authors misapplied the name Cistus libanotis to the species Cistus clusii thereby using this name differently from the original author, Carl Linnaeus.

The term can also be used geographically. For example, Looney (2013) considers "Auricularia polytricha sensu auct. amer." (auctorum americae/americarum) to be a synonym of Auricularia nigricans, meaning that only the use by American authors are treated in their work. "Auct. amer." is particular common compared to similar terms for other continents because the New World has a lot of organisms that resemble described taxa in the Old World but may or may not be the same.

== See also ==
- Author citation (botany)
