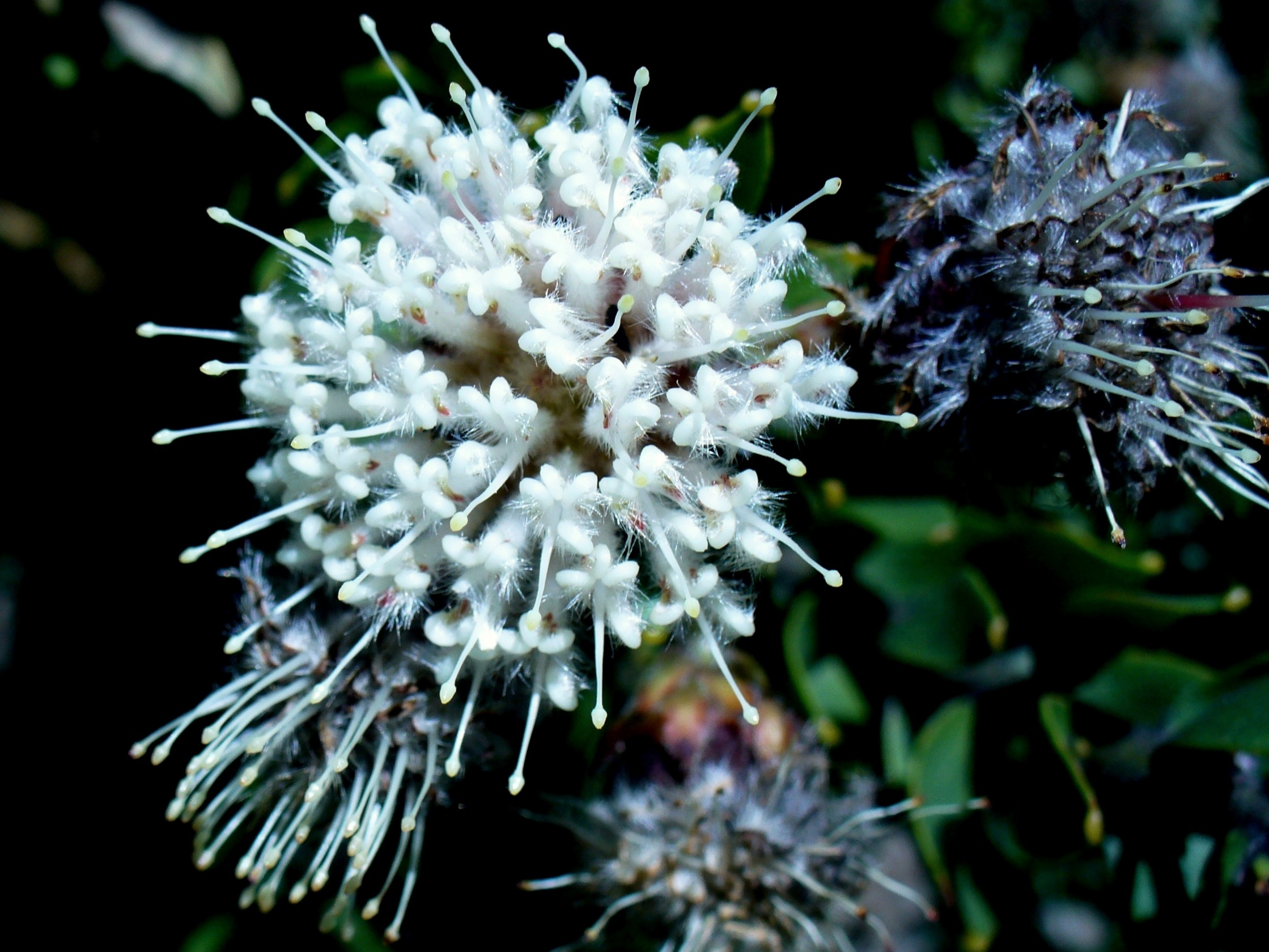

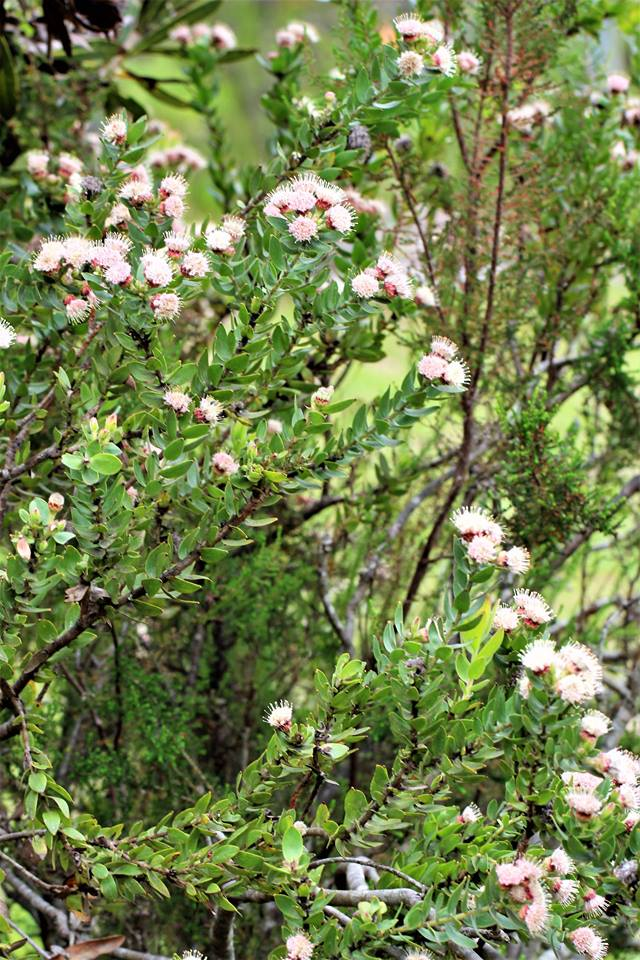

Conservation status
- Near Threatened (IUCN 3.1)

Scientific classification
- Kingdom: Plantae
- Clade: Embryophytes
- Clade: Tracheophytes
- Clade: Angiosperms
- Clade: Eudicots
- Order: Proteales
- Family: Proteaceae
- Genus: Leucospermum
- Species: L. bolusii

Binomial name
- Leucospermum bolusii Gandoger auct. non E.Phillips = L. cordifolium

Synonyms
- L. oleaefolium var. brownii; L. album

= Leucospermum bolusii =

Species of plant native to South Africa

Leucospermum bolusii is a shrub native to South Africa. It grows to 1.5 m (4 ft 11 in) in height, and has nearly hairless leaves with a single apical tooth. The leaves are oval shaped and range from 25–45 mm (0.98–1.77 in) in length. The flower heads are about 2 cm in diameter, slightly flattened globe shaped, are set on a stalk of about 1 cm and crowded with up to eight together at the tip of the branches. They each contain 50–100 small, sweetly scented creamy white flowers, that later turn light pink. Flowering takes place between September and December. It is called Gordon's Bay pincushion in English and witluisiesbos in Afrikaans.

== Description ==
L. bolusii is an evergreen, upright to spreading, rounded shrublet of up to 1½ m (5 ft) in diameter that grows from a single main stem. The flowering branches are upright, slender, 3–5 mm (0.12–0.20 in) in diameter and covered in felty hairs. The leaves that may have some powdery hair when young, lack a stalk, are slightly overlapping, more or less oriented upright, oval to elliptic in shape, 2½–4½ cm (1.0–1.8 in) long, ¾–1½ cm (0.3–0.6 in) wide, with a pointy to blunt, bony tip, usually an entire margin, but sometimes with two or three bony teeth.

The globe-shaped flower heads with a flattened top about 2 cm (0.8 in) in diameter, are set on a woolly stalk of about 1 cm (0.4 in) long and 2 mm (0.08 in) in diameter, and occur in groups of up to eight near the tip of the branches. The common base of the flowers in the same head is flat and 5–7 mm (0.20–0.28 in) wide and is subtended by soft and papery, red to carmine, oval bracts with a pointy tip of 4–5 mm (0.16–0.20 in) long and 2 mm (0.08 in) wide, becoming hairless but with a regular row of short hairs along the margins, set in about three overlapping whorls creating a cup-shaped involucre. The bracts subtending the individual flowers are lance-shaped with a pointy tip, about 7 mm (0.28 in) long and 1½ mm (0.06 in) wide, covered in dense felty or woolly hairs, gully-shaped at mid-length on the inside.

The 4-merous perianth is straight in bud, about 12 mm (0.48 in) long, initially creamy white in colour but later becoming very pale pink. The lower part with the lobes fused (called tube) is about 5 mm (0.20 in) long, hairless at base but powdery higher up an slightly squared across. The middle part where all four lobes become free when the flower opens (called claws), are felty hairy and strongly curled back at its base. The higher part of the lobes (called limbs) is broadly lance-shaped, reddish in colour, about 1 mm (0.04 in) long, are covered by long soft silky hairs on the outside. The style is 1½–2 cm 90.6–0.8 in) long, straight, tapering near the tip. The slightly thickened tip called pollen presenter is pale yellowish green in colour, cone- to egg-shaped and ¾–1 mm (0.03–0.04 in) long. Subtending the ovary are four opaque, thread-shaped scales of about 1 mm long. The flowers of L. bolusii have a strong sweet scent.

== Taxonomy ==
The Gordon's Bay pincushion was first described in 1856 by Carl Meissner, in his contribution on the Proteaceae in 1856 to the series Prodromus Systematis Naturalis Regni Vegetabilis by Alphonse Pyramus de Candolle, as L. oleaefolium var. brownii. In 1901, Michael Gandoger described L. bolusii, based on a specimen collected by Harry Bolus. Pauline Bond in 1941 distinguished L. album. John Patrick Rourke considered all of these synonymous. The plant that Edwin Percy Phillips named L. bolusii however assigns Rourke to L. cordifolium.

L. bolusii has been assigned to the louse pincushions, section Diastelloidea.

The species was named bolusii in honor of South African botanist Harry Bolus, who was the founder of the Bolus Herbarium.

== Distribution, habitat and ecology ==
L. bolusii has a very restricted range, in the hills between Gordon's Bay and the Kogel Bay (halfway to Pringle Bay), in a strip no further than about 400 m (¼ mi) from the sea, and below about 150 m (500 ft) elevation. It grows in fairly dense stands on steep and rocky, westward facing slopes consisting of Table Mountain Sandstone, and give the landscape a pink hue, particularly adjacent to Gordon's Bay. Within this area the annual precipitation is 750–1150 mm (30–45 in).

The flowers of the Gordon's Bay pincushion are pollinated by insects such as flies, butterflies, bees and wasps. After the fruits have fallen to the ground, they are collected by native ants and carried to their nests, where the so-called elaiosome is eaten, while the seed remains underground. The elaisome is a pale, fleshy and tasty part of the fruit, that also contains a pheromone particularly attractive to ants. Here, the seed is protected against consumption by rodents and birds. After an above ground fire has killed the vegetation, and subsequent rain, the seeds germinate and locally revive the species.
