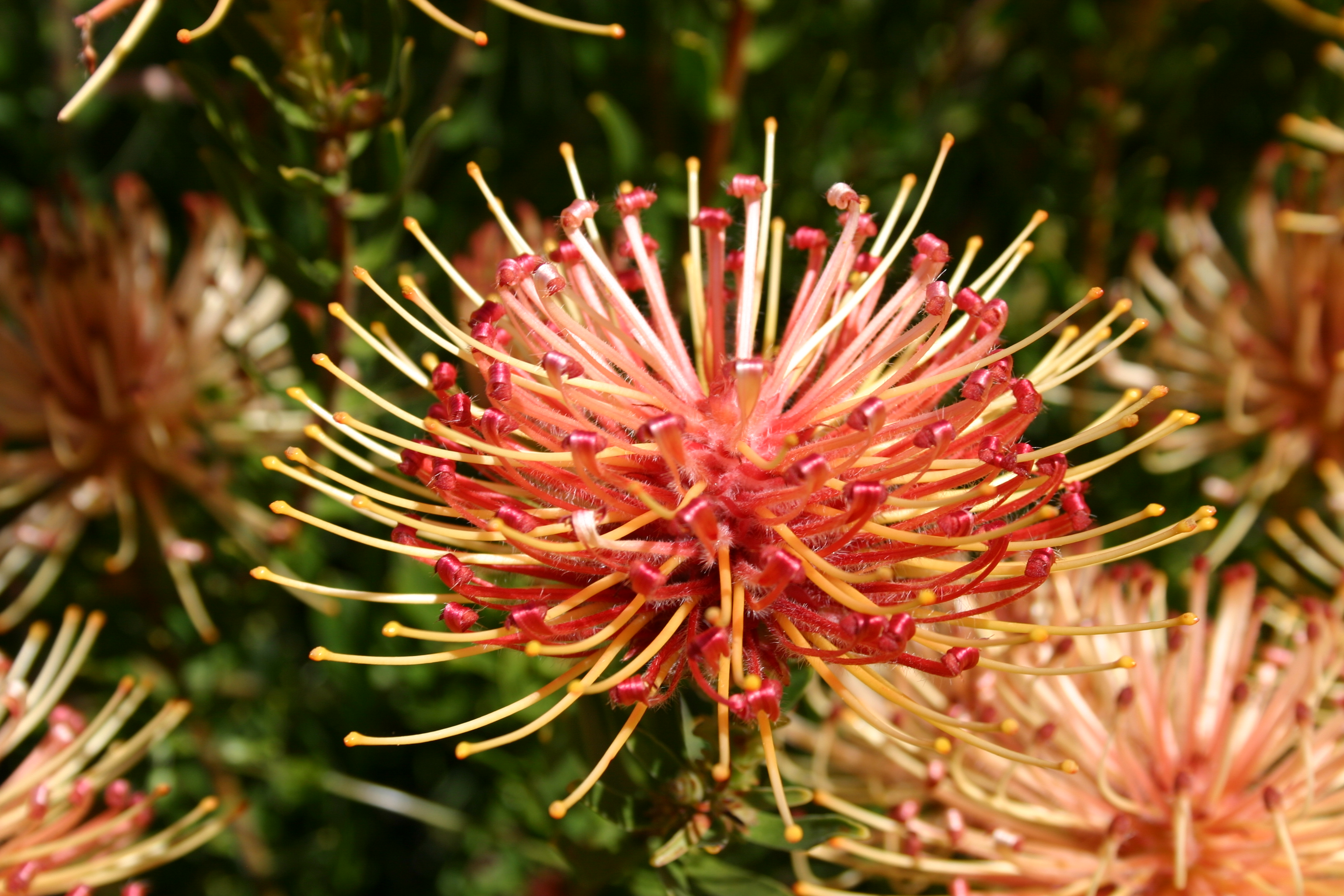

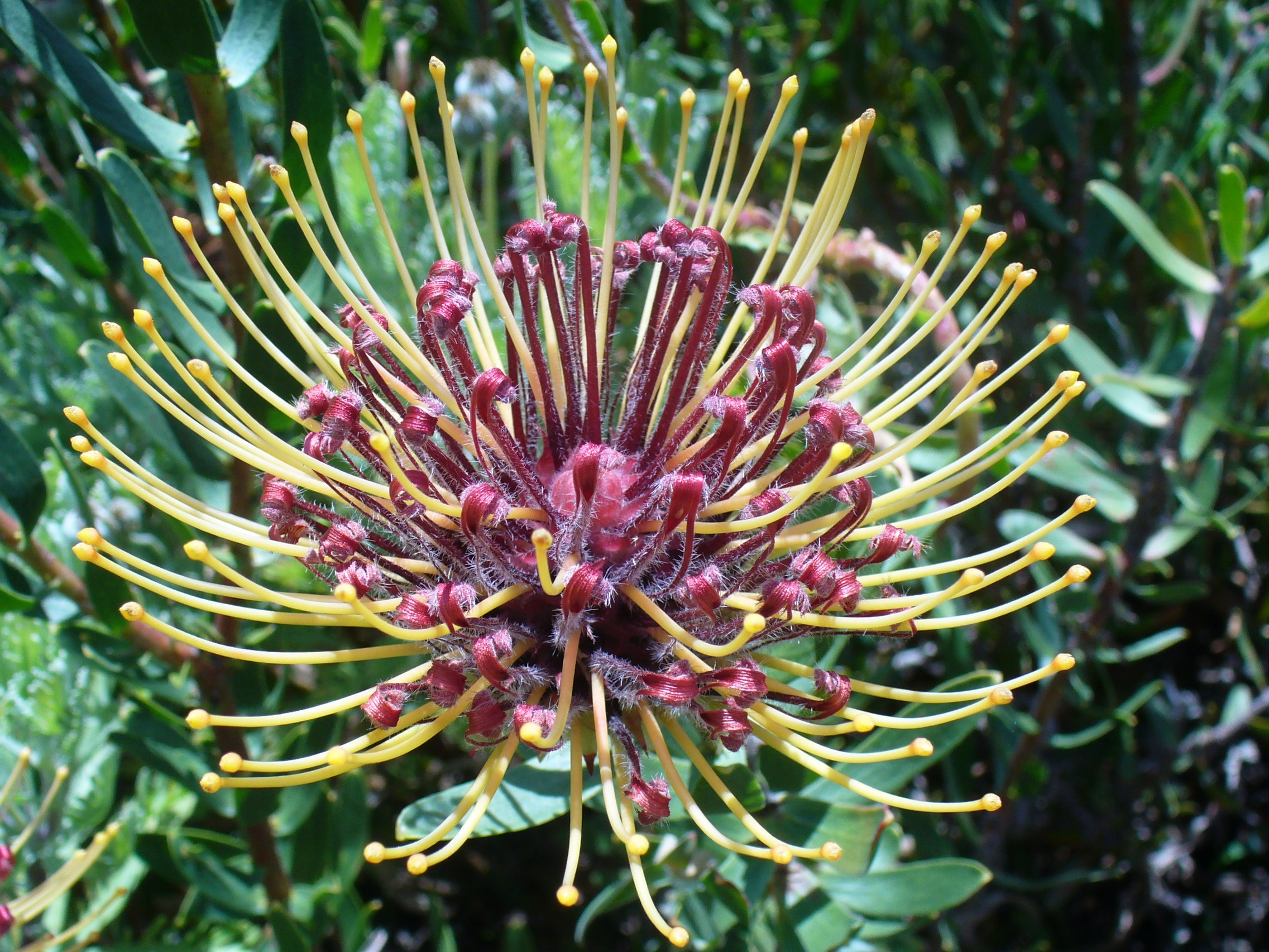

Conservation status
- Near Threatened (IUCN 3.1)

Scientific classification
- Kingdom: Plantae
- Clade: Embryophytes
- Clade: Tracheophytes
- Clade: Angiosperms
- Clade: Eudicots
- Order: Proteales
- Family: Proteaceae
- Genus: Leucospermum
- Species: L. tottum

Binomial name
- Leucospermum tottum (L.) R.Br.

Varieties
- Leucospermum tottum var. tottum; Leucospermum tottum var. glabrum

Synonyms
- Protea totta, P. lotta, Leucadendron tottum; Leucadendrum horizontale

= Leucospermum tottum =

Species of plant native to South Africa

Leucospermum tottum is an upright, evergreen shrub of up to 1½ m (4½ ft) high and 2 m (6 ft) in diameter from the Proteaceae. The oblong, mostly entire leaves with a bony tip are somewhat spreading and distant from each other, and so exposing the stem. It is called elegant pincushion or ribbon pincushion in English, and oranje-rooi speldekussing (orange-red pincushion) or vuurhoutjies (fire sticks) in Afrikaans. Flowers can be found between September and January. The species naturally occurs in the Western Cape province of South Africa. Two different varieties are distinguished, which are genetically very close, but differ in the color, orientation and tube-length of the flowers, the volume and sugar content of the nectar. This is probably an adaptation to different pollinators.

== Description ==
Leucospermum tottum is an upright, evergreen shrub of up to 1½ m (4½ ft) high and 2 m (6 ft) in diameter. It has horizontal flowering stems of 5–7 mm (0.2–0.3 in) in diameter, flushed reddish, with some soft hairs that may be lost with age. The widely spaced leaves stand at right angles with the stem, lack a stalk and hairs, lance-shaped with a pointy tip to long oval, sometimes with a heart-shaped foot, 2½–6 cm (1–2.4 in) long and ½–1½ cm (0.2–0.6 in) wide, the tip bony or sometimes with two or three bony teeth.

The flower heads are usually individually set, low cone-shaped in the bud but becoming disc-shaped when the flowers open, 9–15 cm (3.6–5 in) in diameter on a stalk of 2–3 cm (0.8–1.2 in) long. The common base of the flowers in the same head has a broad cone-shape, 3–4 cm (1.2–1.6 in) high and about 4 cm wide. The bracts that subtend the flower heads are broadly oval to oval with a pointy tip, 10–15 mm (0.4–0.6 in) high and 4–7 mm (0.16–0.28 in) wide, with two papery wings in the lower half, hairless except for a regular line of straight hairs along the margin, standing out or slightly overlapping. The bract subtending the individual flower is broadly oval, about 15 mm (0.6 in) long and 8 mm (0.32 in) broad, softly papery and woolly near the base and powdery hairy to hairless higher up, with a pointy tip. The 4-merous perianth is 4–4½ cm (1.6–1.8 in) long and pale pink in colour. The lower part, that remains merged when the flower is open, is about 7 mm (0.28 in) long, hairless or slightly powdery and somewhat flattened sideways. The middle part (or claws), are each about 1 mm (0.04 in) wide, thinly softly hairy, the one facing the edge of the head free, the other three remaining fused, all strongly curled back. The upper part (or limbs), which enclosed the pollen presenter in the bud, are oval to lance-shaped, each about 3 mm long and 1½ mm, wide dull carmine to brownish in colour and slightly softly hairy. The four anthers are each almost without a filament attached to the limbs. From the centre of the perianth emerges a straight, slender, yellow style of approximately 5 cm (2 in) long, initially slightly curved towards the centre of the head, but straightening with age. The thickened part at the tip of the style called pollen presenter is egg-shaped with a pointy tip, 1–1½ mm (0.04-0.06 in) long, the side facing the centre of the head oblique, with the groove that functions as the stigma across the very tip. The ovary is subtended by four opaque, line- to awl-shaped scales of about 2 mm (0.08 in) long.

=== Differences between the varieties ===
The pale salmon coloured flowers of L. tottum var. tottum are oriented horizontally, have long tubes that contain a small amount of sugar-rich nectar. L. tottum var. glabrum on the other hand has red and yellow more upright flowers with short tubes that contain a large amount of nectar with much less sugar content.

=== Differences with related species ===
L. tottum has narrowly lance-shape to line-shaped oblong leaves, mostly with an entire margin, hairless, loosely overlapping bracts subtending the flower head, egg-shaped pollen presenters and nearly straight styles that become spreading when fully mature.

== Taxonomy ==
Johann Auge, assistant at the Dutch East India Company's garden in Cape Town, probably was the first who collected the ribbon pincushion for science. The governor of the Cape Colony, Ryk Tulbagh, sent the collected plants to Carl Linnaeus in approximately 1769, noting that they had been collected in the Roodezand mountains (near present day Tulbagh). Linnaeus described the species in 1771 and gave it the name Protea totta. In 1804, Jean Poiret in his contribution to a book by Jean-Baptiste Lamarck misspelled the species as P. lotta. In 1809, Richard Anthony Salisbury, in a manuscript by Joseph Knight created the new but superfluous name Leucadendrum horizontale.

In 1891, German botanist Otto Kuntze published Revisio generum plantarum, his response to what he perceived as a lack of method in existing nomenclatural practice. He revived the genus Leucadendron, and made the combination Leucadendron Totta. However, Kuntze's revisionary program was not accepted by the majority of botanists, and Leucospermum was given priority over Leucadendrum in 1900.

John Patrick Rourke regarded L. tottum var. glabrum as the likely hybrid between L. tottum and L. vestitum, but the biomarkers that were compared in 2014 are identical, suggesting a very recent divergence.

L. tottum has been assigned to the showy pincushions, section Brevifilamentum.

It is uncertain, what the meaning is of the epithet tottum, but early Dutch botanist Martinus Houttuyn has suggested that it may be derived from the word Hottentot for the indigenous people of the area in the 18th century. The variety epithet glabrum is Latin and means "smooth" or "hairless".

== Distribution, habitat and ecology ==
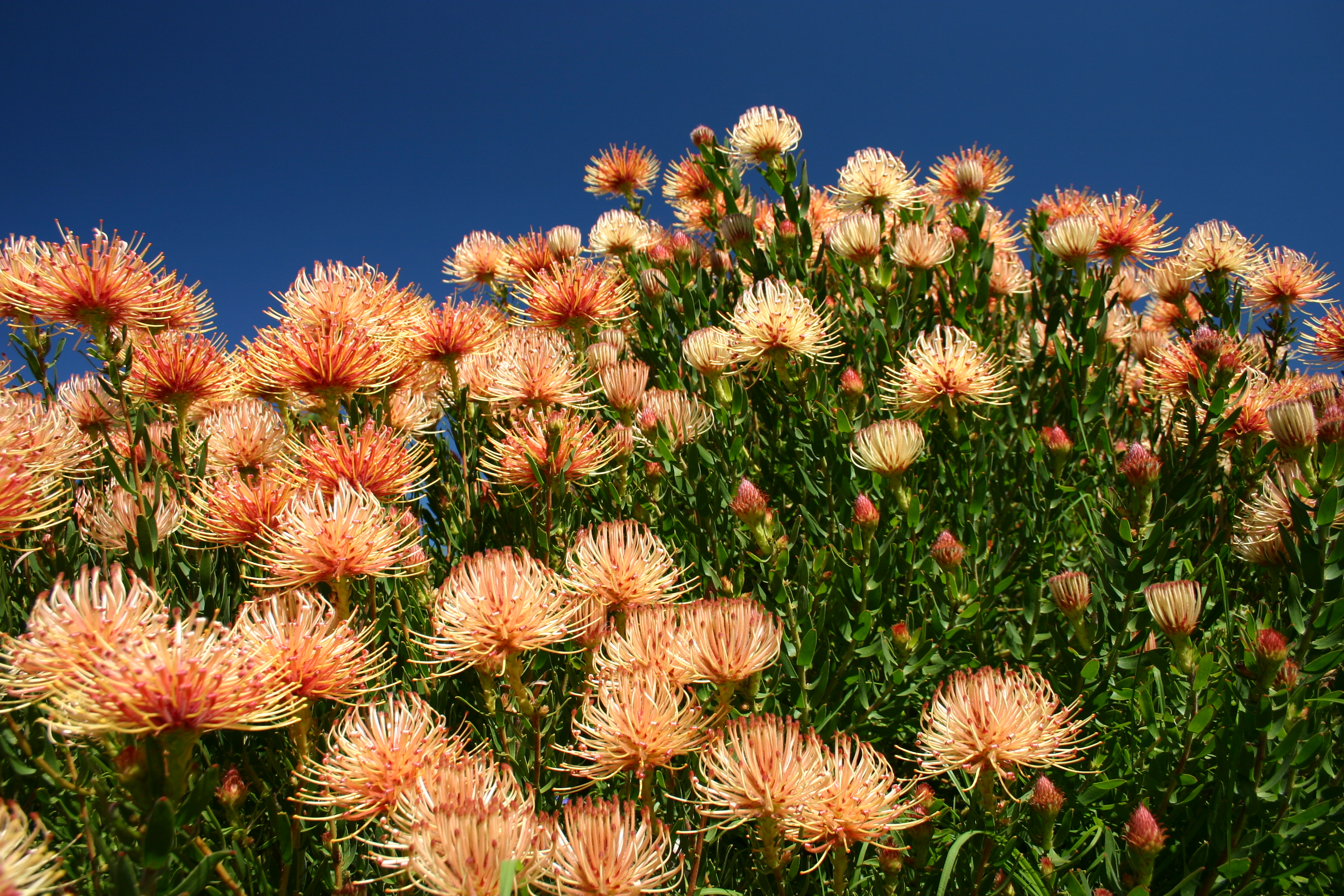
Habit

The ribbon pincushion can be found from Eselbank in the Cederberg in the north, through the Koue Bokkeveld, Ceres, Worcester, and the Paarl Mountains to Villiersdorp in the south. Specimens are usually found individually growing in rugged mountainous terrain on acidulous, nutrient poor soils, at 300–1800 m (1000–6000 ft) altitude, except for a few dense congregations near Villiersdorp and on the Zuurvlakte near Tulbagh. The locations may vary quit a lot, ranging from dry and hot north facing slopes in the Cedarbeg with an annual precipitation of 400–500 mm (15–20 in), to moist and cool, south-facing positions where the yearly rainfall may be as high as 1500 mm (60 in), in both cases mainly falling during the southern winter. L. tottum var. glabrum is restricted to the Jan du Toit's Kloof, which is located in the western Hex River Mountains. The fruits fall to the ground approximately two months after flowering. Here, these are collected by ants, who take them to their underground nest, where the pale, soft elaiosome is consumed, leaving the brown, hard and smooth seed protected against the periodic wildfires that are characteristic for the fynbos in which it grows. After the fire has killed most of the standing vegetation the seeds germinate, so reviving the species on that location.

=== Pollinator specialisation ===
Remarkably, the varieties of L. tottum cannot be distinguished based on eight biomarkers, which is an indication that the divergence between them only started very recently. L. tottum var. tottum that has a small amount of sugar-rich nectar at the bottom of long perianth tubes, is pollinated specifically by Horse-flies with long proboscises (Philoliche rostrata and P. gulosa) and Cape sugarbirds (Promerops cafer), while the orange-breasted sunbird (Anthobaphes violacea) is a less regular visitor. L. tottum var. glabrum has shorter tubes, containing much more but diluted nectar on the other hand, is pollinated exclusively by orange-breasted sunbirds. Although the orange-breasted sunbird can be found on both varieties, it often sits below the flower head in L. tottum var. tottum, and so avoiding contact with the pollen presenters, but in L. tottum var. glabrum the birds mostly sits on top of the flower head. Cape sugarbirds always sit on top of the flower. The horse-flies hover above the flowers and in doing so always contact the pollen presenters. The tube of L. tottum var. tottum is split over the length to accommodate the thick bill of the Cape sugarbird without damage and still accommodate the flies with a narrow tube afterwards. The absence of bird pollinators has a much larger negative effect on the seed production of L. tottum var. glabrum than in L. tottum var. tottum. This is consistent with the specialization for bird-pollination in the former. In addition, L. tottum var. glabrum can set seed with pollen from the same plant, but L. tottum var. tottum depends on cross-pollination. It is considered very likely that the differences in morphology and physiology between the two L. tottum varieties is driven by adaptation to different pollinators.
