= Leucadendron ericifolium =

Conservation status
- Least Concern (IUCN 3.1)

Scientific classification
- Kingdom: Plantae
- Clade: Tracheophytes
- Clade: Angiosperms
- Clade: Eudicots
- Order: Proteales
- Family: Proteaceae
- Genus: Leucadendron
- Species: L. ericifolium

Binomial name
- Leucadendron ericifolium R.Br.

Species of flowering plant

Leucadendron ericifolium, the erica-leaved conebush, is a flower-bearing shrub that belongs to the genus Leucadendron and forms part of the fynbos. The plant is native to the Western Cape, South Africa.

== Description ==
The plant blooms in July with the fruit ripening in November.

In Afrikaans, it is known as Heideblaargeelbos. The tree's national number is 80.

== Distribution and habitat ==
The plant is found in the Outeniqua Mountains, among others.
