= Hottentot (racial term) =

Racial term for the Khoekhoe people of South Africa

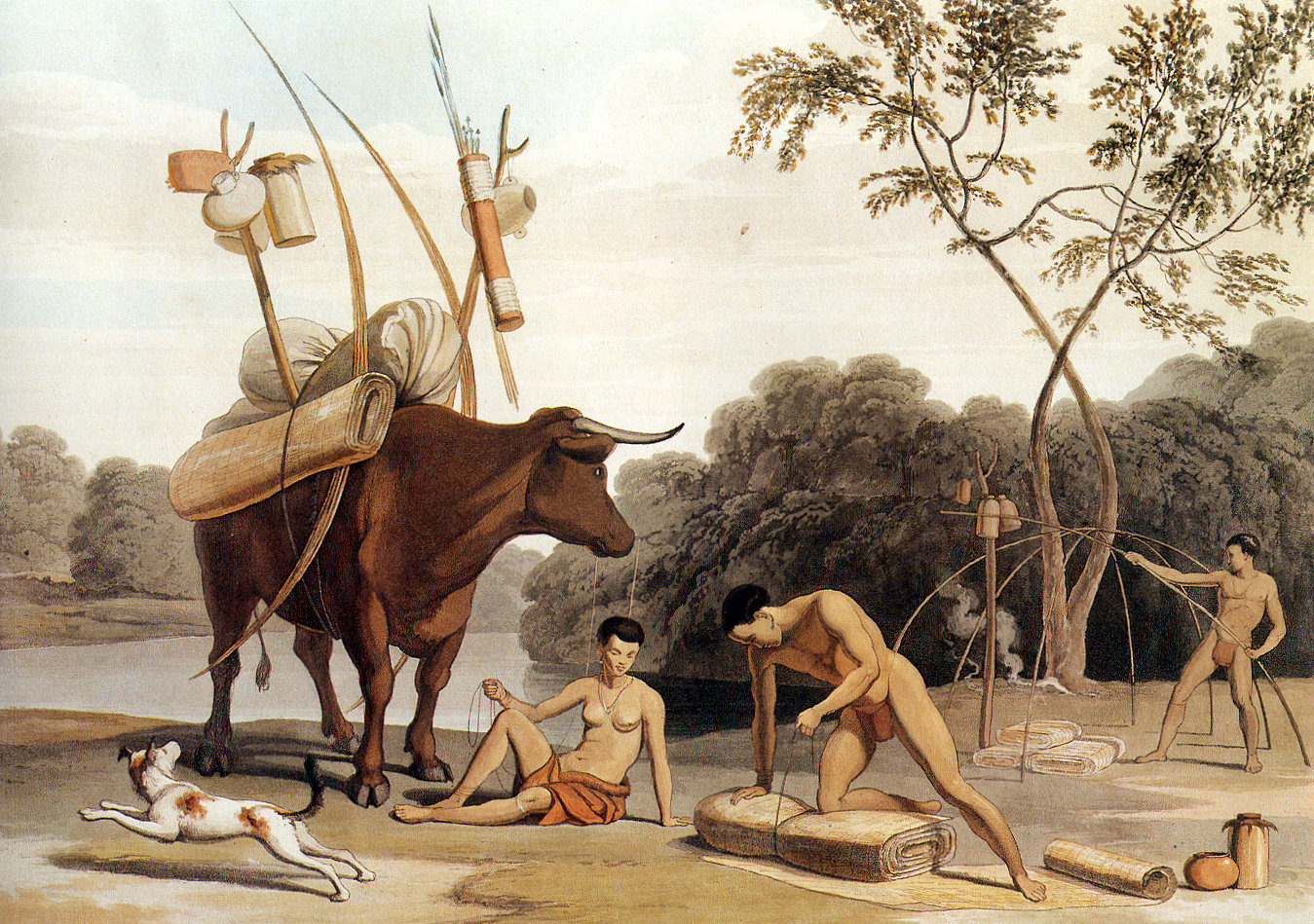
"Korah Hottentots preparing to remove" (Samuel Daniell, 1805)

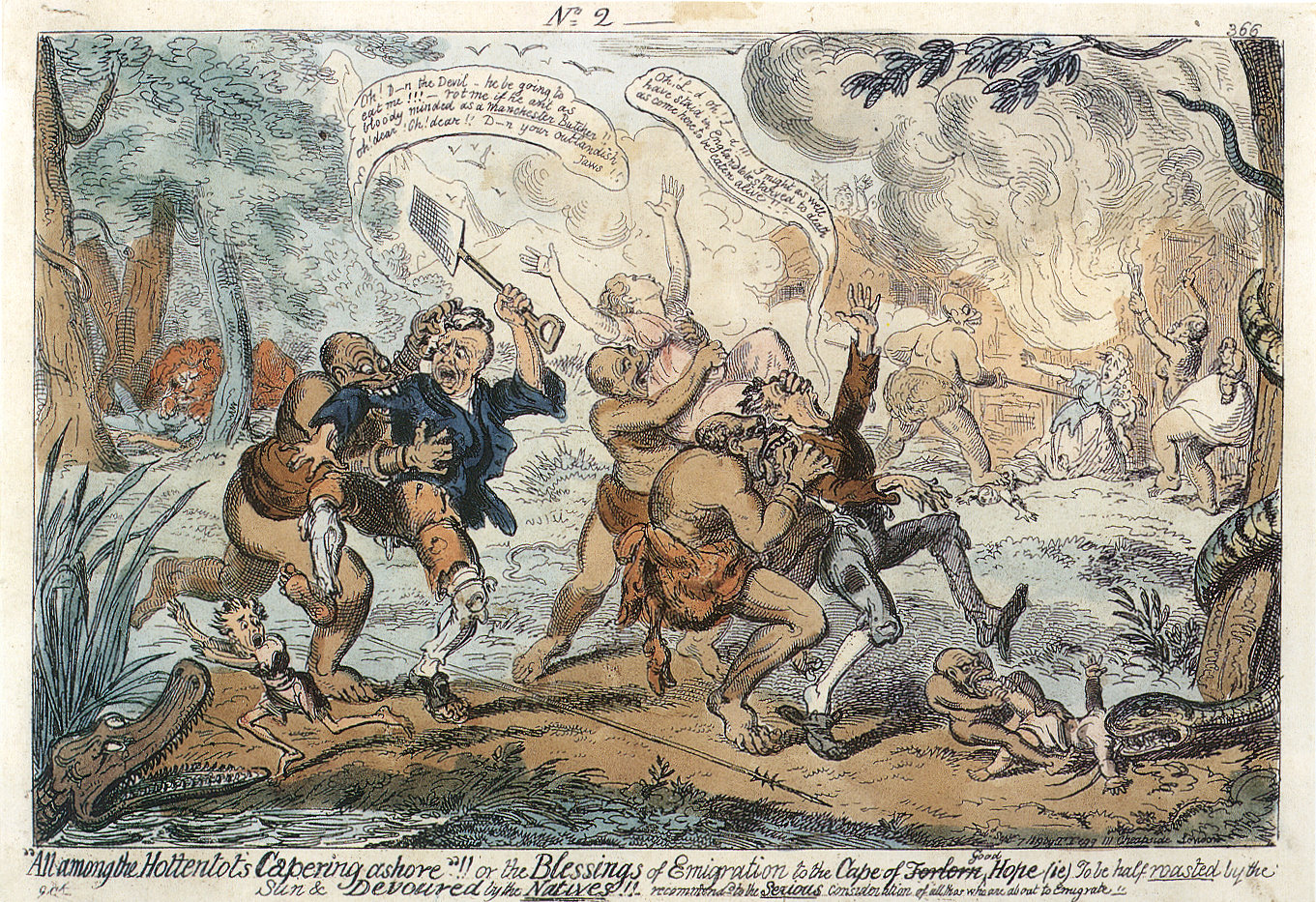
1820 caricature by George Cruikshank showing 1820 Settlers being attacked by cannibal "Hottentots"

Hottentot (/ˈhɒtəntɒt/ HOT-ən-tot) is a term historically used by Europeans to refer to the Khoekhoe, the indigenous pastoralists of the Western Cape area of Southern Africa. Use of the term is now considered offensive, with one preferred alternative being Khoekhoe (formerly Khoikhoi). (Note: "Khoisan" is an artificial compound term that was introduced into 20th-century ethnology, but since the late 1990s it has been adopted as a self-designation. Since 2017, its use has been official due to the passage of a Traditional & Khoisan Leadership Bill by the South African National Assembly.)

== Etymology ==
Hottentot originated among the "old Dutch" settlers of the Dutch Cape Colony run by United East India Company (VOC), who arrived in the region in the 1650s, and it entered English usage from Dutch in the seventeenth century. However, no definitive Dutch etymology for the term is known. A widely claimed etymology is from a supposed Dutch expression equivalent to "stammerer, stutterer", applied to the Khoikhoi on account of the distinctive click consonants in their languages. There is, however, no earlier attestation of a word hottentot to support this theory. An alternative possibility is that the name derived from an overheard term in chants accompanying Khoikhoi or San dances, but seventeenth-century transcriptions of such chants offer no conclusive evidence for this.

An early Anglicisation of the term is recorded as hodmandod in the years around 1700. The reduced Afrikaans/Dutch form hotnot has also been borrowed by South African English as a derogatory term for black people, including Cape Coloureds.

== Usage as an ethnic term ==
In seventeenth-century Dutch, Hottentot was at times used to denote all black people (synonymously with Kaffir, which was at times likewise used for Cape Coloureds and Khoisans), but at least some speakers used the term Hottentot specifically for what they thought of as a race distinct from the supposedly darker-skinned people referred to as Kaffirs. This distinction between the non-Bantu "Cape Blacks" or "Cape Coloureds" and the Bantu was noted as early as 1684 by the French anthropologist François Bernier. The idea that Hottentot referred strictly to the non-Bantu peoples of southern Africa was well embedded in colonial scholarly thought by the end of the eighteenth century.

The main meaning of Hottentot as an ethnic term in the 19th and the 20th centuries has therefore been to denote the Khoikhoi people specifically. However, Hottentot also continued to be used through the eighteenth, nineteenth, and twentieth centuries in a wider sense, to include all of the people now usually referred to with the modern term Khoisan (not only the Khoikhoi, but also the San people, hunter-gatherer populations from the interior of southern Africa who had not been known to the seventeenth-century settlers, once often referred to as Bosjesmannen in Dutch and Bushmen in English).

In George Murdock's Atlas of World Cultures (1981), the author refers to "Hottentots" as a "subfamily of the Khoisan linguistic family" who "became detribalized in contact with Dutch settlers in 1652, mixing with the latter and with slaves brought by them from Indonesia to form the hybrid population known today as the Cape Coloured." The term Hottentot remained in use as a technical ethnic term in anthropological and historiographical literature into the late 1980s. The 1996 edition of the Dictionary of South African English merely says that "the word 'Hottentot' is seen by some as offensive and Khoikhoi is sometimes substituted as a name for the people, particularly in scholarly contexts". Yet, by the 1980s, because of the racist connotations discussed below, it was increasingly seen as too derogatory and offensive to be used in an ethnic sense.

== Usage as a term of abuse and racist connotations ==
From the eighteenth century onwards, the term hottentot was also a term of abuse without a specific ethnic sense, comparable to barbarian or cannibal. According to James Boswell's The Life of Johnson, Samuel Johnson was parodied in Lord Chesterfield's Letters of 1737 as "a respectable Hottentot".

In its ethnic sense, Hottentot had developed its connotations of savagery and primitivism by the seventeenth century; colonial depictions of the Hottentots (Khoikhoi) in the seventeenth to eighteenth century were characterized by savagery, often suggestive of cannibalism or the consumption of raw flesh, physiological features such as steatopygia and elongated labia perceived as primitive or "simian" and a perception of the click sounds in the Khoikhoi languages as "bestial". Thus, it can be said that the European, colonial image of "the Hottentot" from the seventeenth century onwards bore little relation to any realities of the Khoisan in Africa, and that this image fed into the usage of hottentot as a generalised derogatory term. Correspondingly, the word is "sometimes used as ugly slang for a black person".

Use of the derived term hotnot was explicitly proscribed in South Africa by 2008. Accordingly, much recent scholarship on the history of colonial attitudes to the Khoisan or on the European trope of "the Hottentot" puts the term Hottentot in scare quotes.

== Other usages ==
In its original role of ethnic designator, the term Hottentot was included into a variety of derived terms, such as the Hottentot Corps, the first Coloured unit to be formed in the South African army, originally called the Corps Bastaard Hottentoten (Dutch; in English: "Corps Bastard Hottentots"), organised in 1781 by the Dutch colonial administration of the time.

The word is also used in the common names of a wide variety of plants and animals, such as the Africanis dogs sometimes called "Hottentot hunting dogs", the fish Pachymetopon blochii, frequently simply called hottentots, Carpobrotus edulis, commonly known as a "hottentot-fig", and Trachyandra, commonly known as "hottentot cabbage". It has also given rise to the scientific name for a genus of scorpion, Hottentotta, a species of African mole-rat, Cryptomys hottentotus, and may be the origin of the epithet tottum in the botanical name Leucospermum tottum.

The word is still used as part of a tongue-twister in modern Dutch, "Hottentottententententoonstelling", meaning a "Hottentot tent exhibition". In Czech, the word is sometimes used to refer to unintelligible speech. In German, the word can be used to mock stuttering.

In the 1964 film Mary Poppins, Admiral Boom mistakes the rooftop-dancing chimney sweeps for an attack by "Hottentots". In 2024, the BBFC raised the film's age rating from U to PG due to this instance of "discriminatory language".

The Shakespears Sister song "I Don't Care", from the 1992 album Hormonally Yours, includes the lines, borrowed from Edith Sitwell's poem Hornpipe: "In a boreolic iceberg came Victoria; Queen Victoria, sitting shocked upon on the rocking horse of a wave, Said to the Laureat, this minx of course, Is sharp as any lynx, and blacker, deeper Than the drinks, as hot as any hottentot."

== See also ==
- Hottentot Venus
- The Hottentot (1922 film)
- Terre Haute Hottentots
