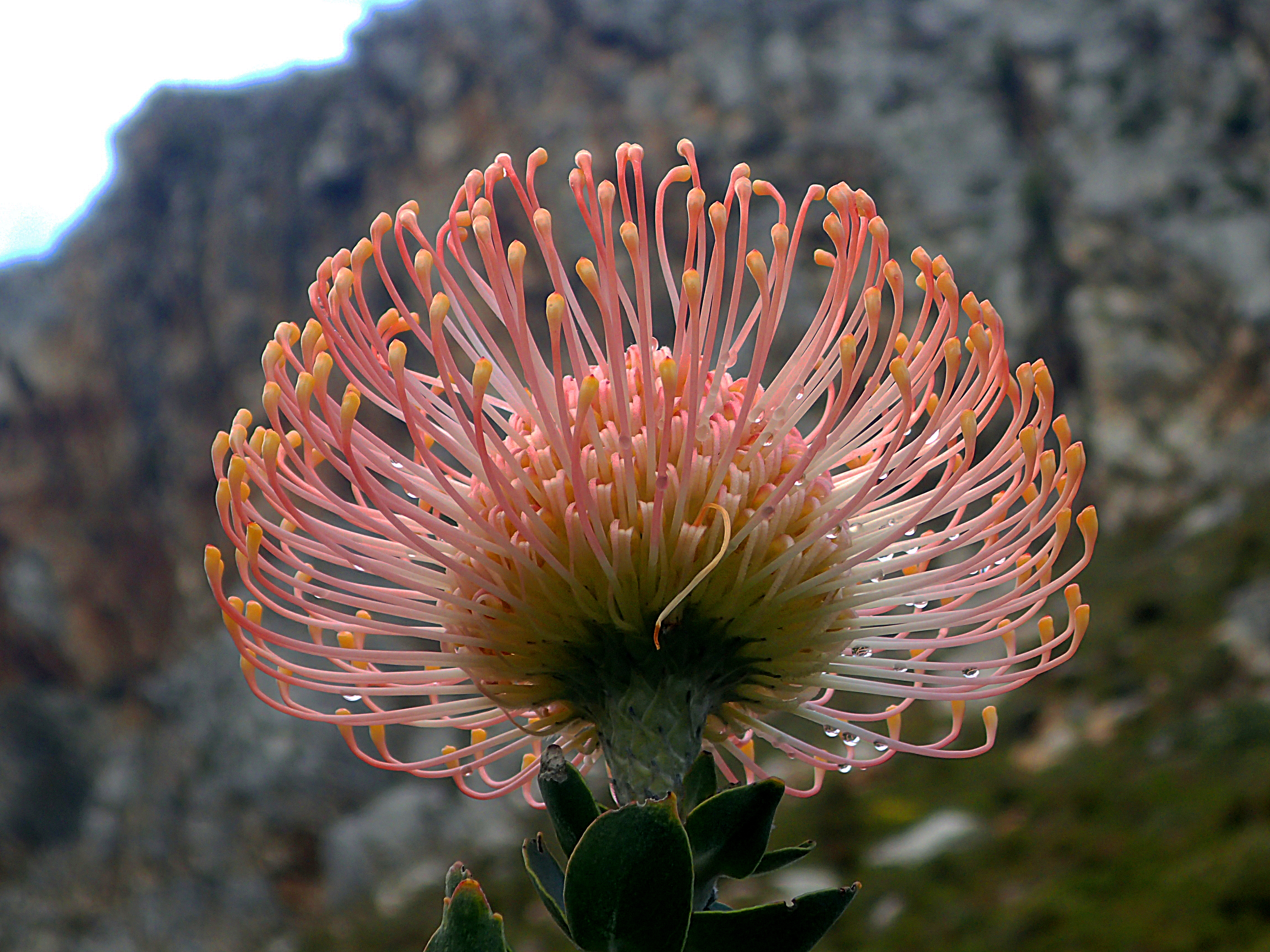

Conservation status
- Near Threatened (IUCN 3.1)

Scientific classification
- Kingdom: Plantae
- Clade: Embryophytes
- Clade: Tracheophytes
- Clade: Angiosperms
- Clade: Eudicots
- Order: Proteales
- Family: Proteaceae
- Genus: Leucospermum
- Species: L. cordifolium

Binomial name
- Leucospermum cordifolium (Salisb. ex Knight) Fourc.

Synonyms
- Leucodendrum cordifolium; L. nutans, Protea nutans, Leucadendron nutans; L. bolusii E.Phillips, 1910 auct. non L. bolusii Gandoger, 1901; L. mixtum; L. integrifolium; L. meisneri

= Leucospermum cordifolium =

Species of plant native to South Africa

Leucospermum cordifolium is an upright, evergreen shrub of up to 1½ m (5 ft) high from the Proteaceae. The flower heads are globe-shape with a flattened top, 10–12 cm (3.9–4.7 in) in diameter, and are carried individually or with two or three together mostly at a right angle to its branch. The perianth is 3–3½ cm long, yellow, orange or crimson in color. From each flower emerges a 4½–6 cm (1.8–2.4 in) long style sticking out horizontally but curving upwards near the obliquely, shell-shaped, thicker pollen presenter. This gives each head the appearance of a pincushion. Its common name is ornamental pincushion in English and bobbejaanklou in Afrikaans. It flowers between the middle of July and the end of November. It naturally occurs near the south coast of the Western Cape province of South Africa. Varieties and hybrids of this species are used as cut flower and garden plant.

== Description ==
L. cordifolium is a rounded and spreading shrub of up to 1½ m (5 ft) high and 2 m (6.6 ft) in diameter that has a single trunk at its base from which branches spread horizontally and often bend towards the ground. The flowering stems may be more or less erect or spreading 5–8 mm (0.20–0.31 in) in diameter initially covered in short, fine, cringy hairs, which may go lost with age. The hard, green leaves are set alternately along the branches, more or less directed upwards, oval or heart-shaped with an entire margin near the flowers and bluntly oblong and with up to six bony teeth at the tip lower down, 2–8 cm (0.79–3.15 in) long and 2–4½ cm (0.8–1.8 in) wide, softly hairy at first, becoming hairless.

The flower heads are set on stalk of up to 1½ cm (0.6 in) long, have a flattened globe-shape of 10–12 cm (3.9–4.7 in) in diameter, and are carried individually or with two or three together mostly at a right angle to its branch. The common base is narrowly conical in shape with a pointy tip 3–3½ cm (1.2–1.4 in) long and ¾ cm (0.3 in) wide. The bracts that subtend the flower head consists of oval bracts with a pointy tip of 4–5 mm (0.16–0.20 in) wide and about 8 mm (0.31 in) long, overlapping and pressed against the common base, rubbery and with some short and soft hair. The bracts at the foot of each individual flower are concave, embrace the perianth at its base, have a pointy, incurved tip 8–10 mm (0.31–0.39 in) long and about 7 mm (0.28 in) wide, with a rubbery consistency and thickly woolly at its base.

The perianth is 3–3½ cm long, yellow, orange or crimson in color. The cylindric perianth tube is hairless and 8–10 mm (0.31–0.39 in). The three periant lobes at the side of the centre of the flowerhead remain united and form a hairless, rolled sheath, except for some rigid hairs on the margins. The lobe facing towards the rim of the flowerhead is free. The anthers are ovate and sit atop a 1 mm (0.039 in) long filament. The style is 4½–6 cm (1.8–2.4 in) long, sticking out horizontally but curving upwards near the obliquely shell-shaped pollen presenter, with a flattened tip that also contains an oblique groove that functions as the stigma. Subtending the ovary are four awl-shaped scales of about 2 mm (0.079 in) long.

The subtribe Proteinae, to which the genus Leucospermum has been assigned, consistently has a basic chromosome number of twelve (2n=24).

=== Differences with related species ===
The ornamental pincushion can be distinguished by its spreading habit, with horizontal branches, leaf-shapes that range from oblong with teeth in the earliest growth of the season to entire and oval closer to the flower heads. The flower heads are generally at a right angle to the branch it grows from, on the perianth lobes are only some soft hairs and the pollen presenter has a skewed shell shape. The closely related L. patersonii is more tree-like, with larger, less variable, broadly oblong leaves that consistently have three to eight teeth near the tip, woolly perianth lobes and upright flower heads.

== Taxonomy ==
In 1809, Joseph Knight published a book titled On the cultivation of the plants belonging to the natural order of Proteeae, that contained an extensive revision of the Proteaceae attributed to Richard Anthony Salisbury. Salisbury was the first to describe the ornamental pincushion and named it Leucadendrum cordifolium. In 1900 however, his generic names were suppressed in favour of those proposed by Robert Brown. Robert Brown called the species Leucospermum nutans in 1810. In 1841, the French botanist Jean Poiret moved the species and made the combination Protea nutans. Otto Kuntze moved the species again, now to his genus Leucadendron, making the combination Leucadendron nutans in 1891. Kuntze's genus however is a later synonym of Leucospermum by Brown, and a later homonym of Leucadendron as proposed by Linnaeus. The species name proposed by Salisbury is the earliest and was not suppressed unlike his genus name. Edwin Percy Phillips described a slightly different form in 1910 and called it Leucospermum mixtum, while a third form was named Leucospermum bolusii, a later homonym of the name proposed by Michel Gandoger in 1901 for another species. Leucospermum integrifolium was described by Gandoger and Hans Schinz in 1913, and Leucospermum meisneri by Gandoger that same year. In 1932, Henry Georges Fourcade realised the new combination Leucospermum cordifolium needed to be made. John Patrick Rourke in 1970 considered all of these names synonyms of Leucospermum cordifolium.

L. cordifolium has been assigned to the showy pincushions, section Brevifilamentum.

The species name cordifolium is compounded from the Latin words cordis meaning "heart" and folium meaning "leaf", so heart-shaped leaf.

== Distribution, habitat and ecology ==
Leucospermum cordifolium can be found in a strip between Soetanysberg, Bredasdorp, Elim and Napier, Western Cape in the southeast, through Stanford, Caledon, Onrusrivier and Botrivier, to Aries Kraal in the northwest, in the foothills of the Kogelberg. Unlike close relative L. patersonii that is confined to limestone ridges, L. cordifolium can only be found on acid soils that derived from Table Mountain Sandstone. Groups or individuals grow in open, hilly terrain at 30–450 m (100–1500 ft) in a fynbos vegetation that mostly consist of other Proteaceae, several Erica species and Restionaceae. Along its distribution area, the average annual precipitation is 625–1025 mm (15–40 in), which predominantly falls during the winter half year.

The ornamental pincushion is pollinated by birds. The ripe fruits fall to the ground about two months after flowering. Here these are collected by native ants that carry them to their underground nests. Here the seeds remain protected against fire, seed-eating rodents and birds. After a fire has cleared the vegetation cover, increased daily temperature fluctuations and chemicals from charred wood seeping to the seeds with the rain, promote germination and so revives the pincushion at these locations. Tests showed that germination is best with the temperature fluctuating daily between 9 and 24 °C (48 and 75 °F), which corresponds to the micro climate during winter in its home range after the vegetation has been cleared.
