= Ant supercolony =

Exceptionally large ant colony

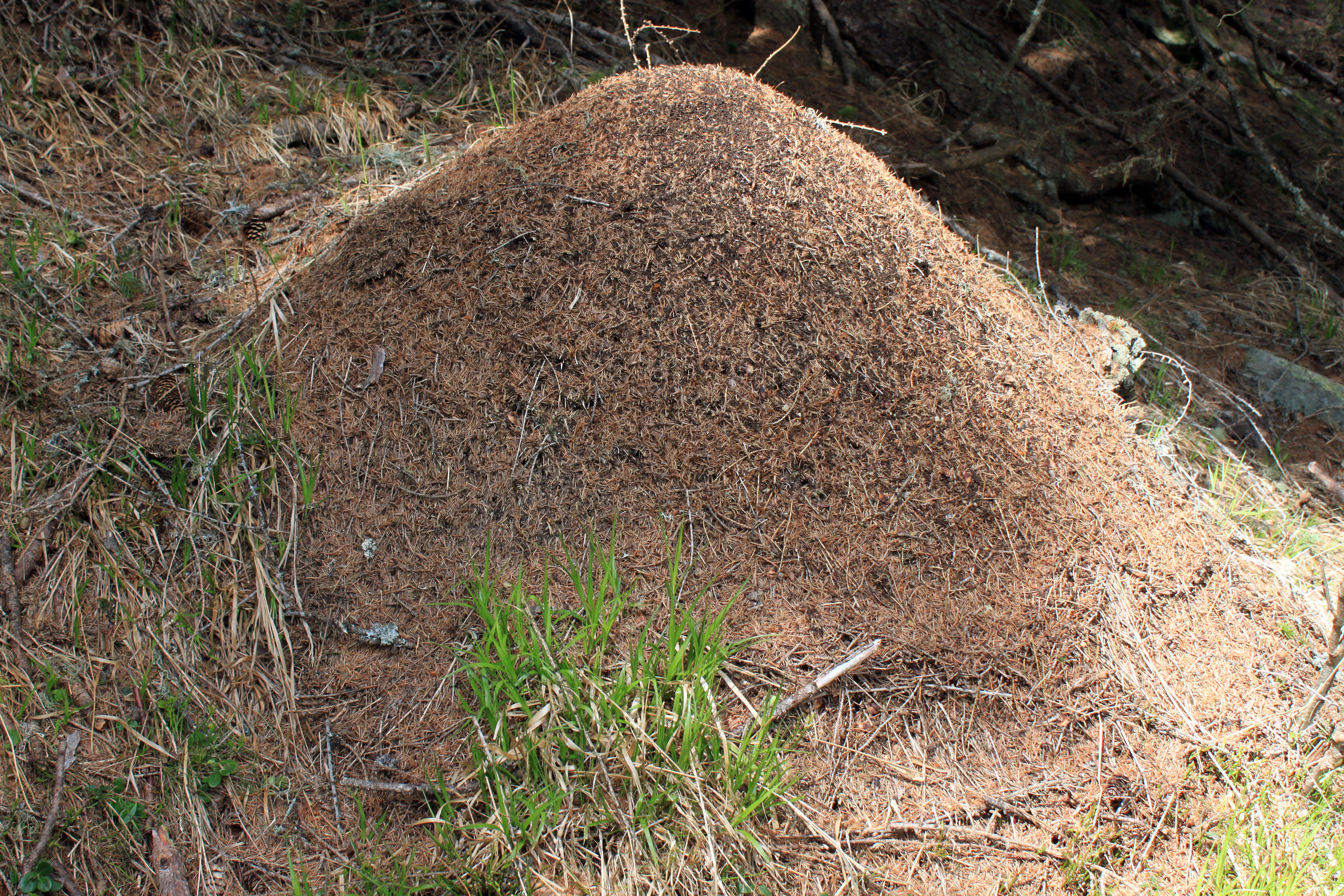
Large anthill in South Tyrol

An ant supercolony is an exceptionally large ant colony, consisting of a high number of spatially separated but socially connected nests of a single ant species (meaning that the colony is polydomous), spread over a large area without territorial borders. Supercolonies are typically polygynous, containing many egg-laying females (queens or gynes). Workers and queens from different nests within the same supercolony can freely move among the nests, and all workers cooperate indiscriminately with each other in collecting food and care of the brood, and show no apparent mutual aggressive behavior.

As long as suitable unoccupied space with sufficient resources is available, supercolonies expand continuously through budding, as queens together with some workers migrate over short distances and establish a new connected nest. The supercolony can also expand over long distances through jump-dispersal, potentially ranging between continents. Jump-dispersal usually occurs unintentionally through human-mediated transport. A striking example of an ant species forming supercolonies across continents is the Argentine ant (Linepithema humile). The also highly invasive red imported fire ant (Solenopsis invicta) and Solenopsis geminata additionally use classic mating flights, thus using three primary modes of dispersal. Out of some 14,000 described ant species, supercolonialism is found in less than 1% of all ants.

In general, ants that form supercolonies are invasive and harmful in the non-native environments. While not all supercolonial species are invasive and not all invasive ants are dominant, supercolonies are usually associated with invasive populations. Some invasive species are known to form supercolonies in their native habitat as well. In their native range, relatively small supercolonies are observed, whereas they are much larger, dominant and a threat for ecological diversity in their invasive range. Exceptions of species that form supercolonies without being invasive are mainly found in the genus Formica.

Although supercolonies are mainly observed in relatively few ant species, similar unicolonial populations are also found in some species of the termite genus Reticulitermes.

== Unicoloniality versus supercoloniality ==
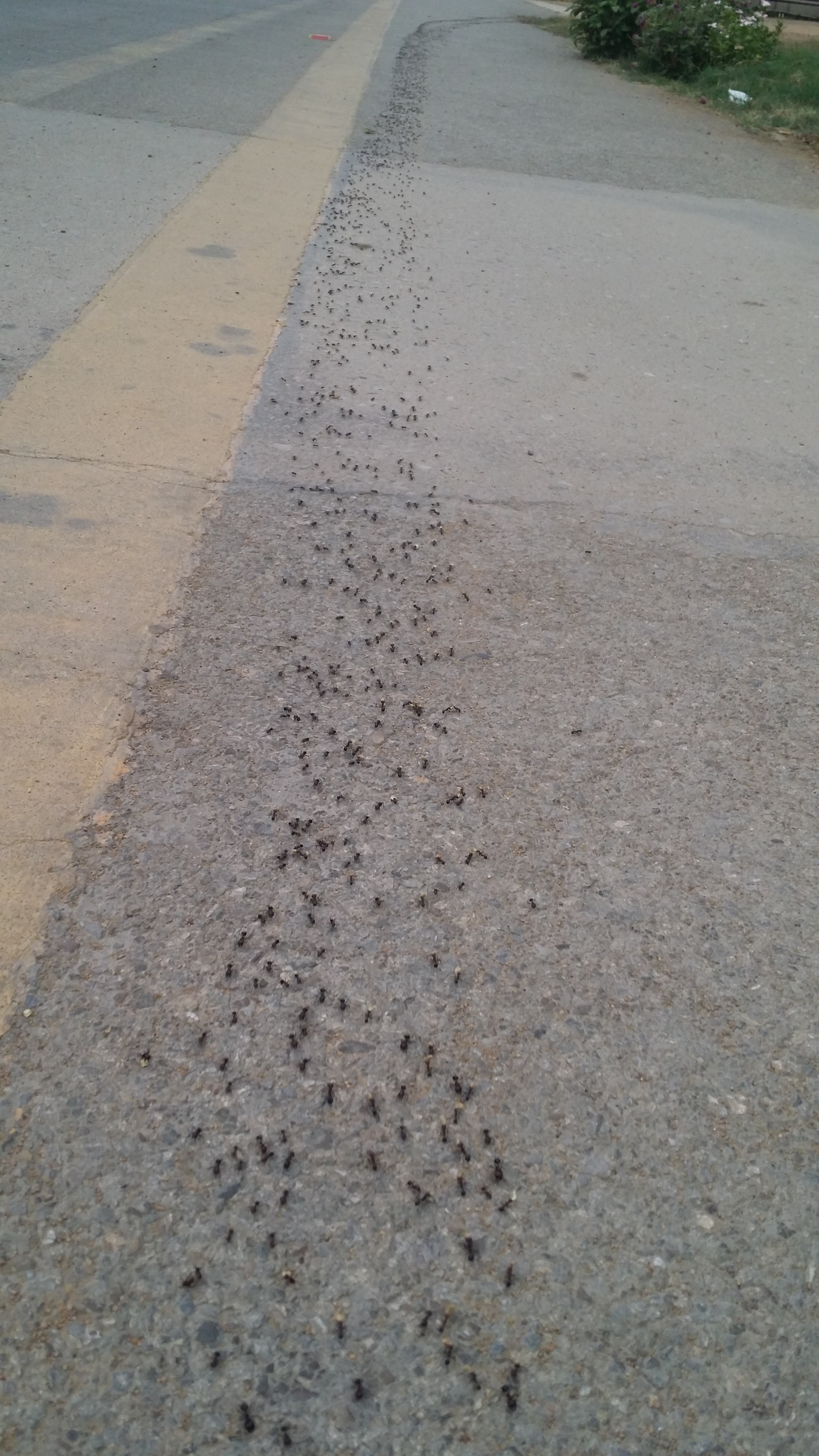
Large trail of ants

Initially, it was hypothesized that unicoloniality is a characteristic of certain ant species in which all workers of that species are amicable, whatever their nest of origin. So, all members of the species would accept each other, irrespective of the nest of origin and irrespective of the distance between the nests. In contrast, multicoloniality is the common characteristic of ants to show all colonies being aggressive to each other, including different colonies of the same species. A supercolony would be a large aggregation of nests of a species that normally would exhibit multicoloniality, but in the case of a supercolony has all workers from all connected nests being non-aggressive to each other. The Argentine ant (Linepithema humile), forming megacolonies of spatially separate nests, was thought to be a perfect example of unicoloniality, never exhibiting multicoloniality.

Giraud et al. (2002), however, discovered that L. humile also forms supercolonies that are aggressive to each other, so unicoloniality turned out to be limited. They hypothesized that the difference between supercoloniality and unicoloniality is not clear-cut, but that they are rather points on a continuum between two extremes: multicoloniality with all colonies generally being aggressive to each other, contrasted with unicoloniality with absolute absence of aggression between colonies, and supercoloniality somewhere in between.

Therefore, Pedersen et al. (2006) redefined supercoloniality and unicoloniality as follows:

Supercolony: A colony that contains such a large number of nests that direct cooperative interactions are impossible between individuals in distant nests. There are no behavioral boundaries (aggression) within the supercolony.

Unicolonial: A unicolonial species is one that can form supercolonies. A unicolonial population consists of one or several supercolonies.

They suggest that the success of invasive ants such as L. humile stems from the ecological conditions in the introduced range that allow to dramatically extend the dimension of supercolonies, rather than from a shift in social organization in the invaded habitat.

== Supercolonies in termites ==
Although supercolonies are mainly observed in relatively few ant species, similar unicolonial populations are also found in some species of the termite genus Reticulitermes.

In France, a supercolony of the invasive termite species Reticulitermes urbis was observed, covering about seven hectares, similar to an ant supercolony. Invasive unicolonial metapopulations of Reticulitermes flavipes in Toronto, Canada are described in 2012. They can cover tens of kilometers, number hundreds of thousands or millions of individuals and show lack of intercolony aggression. Especially in urban habitats they form area-wide supercolonies.

== Examples ==
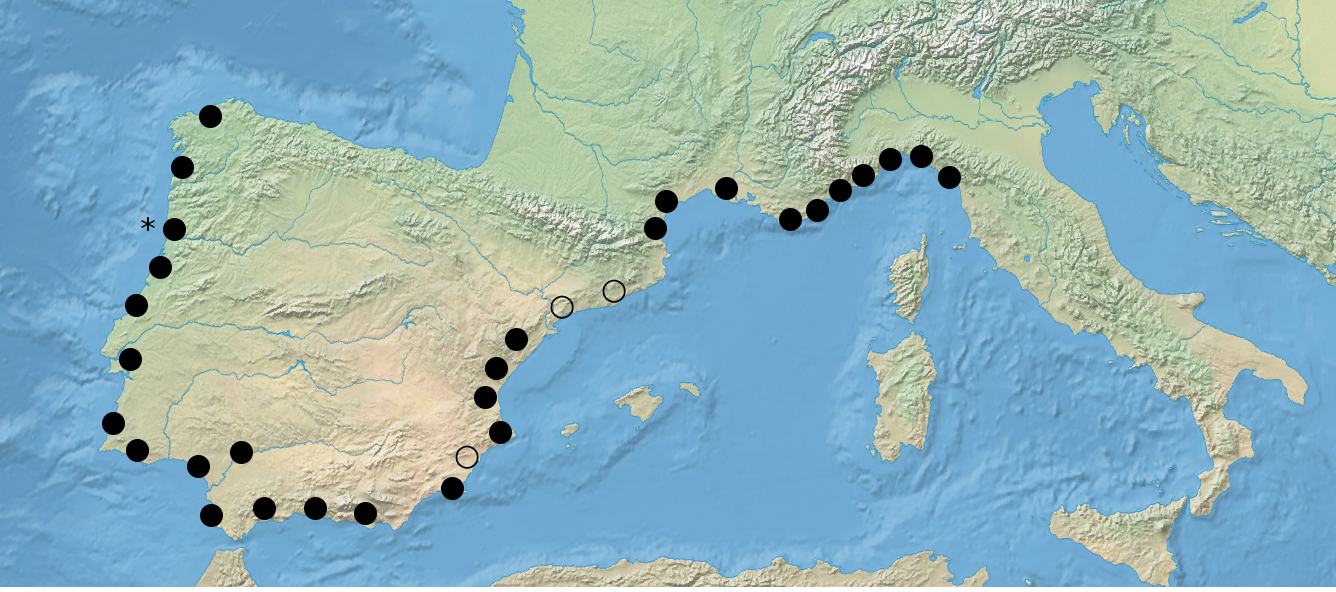
Map of 33 European populations of Linepithema humile sampled. Populations were assigned to one of two distinct groups based on the aggression tests: the main supercolony (●) and the Catalan supercolony (○). In the population marked with asterisk, workers were heavily infected with mites, which affected the behavioral interactions. Consequently, this population was not included in the analysis of behavioral data.

Species known to form supercolonies are:

- Anoplolepis gracilipes (yellow crazy ant)
- Formica
  - Formica aquilonia
  - Formica exsecta
  - Formica obscuripes
  - Formica polyctena
  - Formica yessensis
- Iridomyrmex purpureus (meat ant)
- Lasius neglectus
- Lepisiota
  - Lepisiota canescens
  - Lepisiota frauenfeldi
  - Lepisiota incisa
- Linepithema humile (Argentine ant)
- Monomorium pharaonis
- Myrmica rubra
- Nylanderia fulva (tawny crazy ant)
- Paratrechina longicornis
- Pheidole megacephala
- Plagiolepis
  - Plagiolepis alluaudi (little yellow ant)
  - Plagiolepis invadens
  - Plagiolepis pygmaea
  - Plagiolepis schmitzii
- Polyrhachis robsoni
- Pseudomyrmex veneficus
- Solenopsis
  - Solenopsis geminata (tropical fire ant)
  - Solenopsis invicta (red imported fire ant, or RIFA)
  - Solenopsis richteri (black imported fire ant, or BIFA)
  - Solenopsis saevissima (pest fire ant)
- Tapinoma
  - Tapinoma darioi
  - Tapinoma ibericum
  - Tapinoma magnum
  - Tapinoma sessile
- Technomyrmex albipes
- Tetramorium alpestre
- Vollenhovia emeryi
- Wasmannia auropunctata

=== Formica ===
A supercolony of Formica obscuripes in the US state of Oregon, consisting of more than 200 nests and an estimated population of 56 million individuals was described in 1997.

The Ishikari supercolony of Formica yessensis on Hokkaido, Japan comprise estimated more than 45,000 nests, more than 300,000,000 workers and more than 1,000,000 queens.

=== Tapinoma ===
Three of the four species identified in the `Tapinoma nigerrimum complex´ are known as supercolonial: T. darioi, T. ibericum and T. magnum. Tapinoma nigerrimum is monodomous to moderately polydomous, multicolonial, and supercoloniality is unknown.

Tapinoma sessile lives in its natural habitat in small colonies. Invaded in urban areas, it exhibits extreme polygyny and polydomy and becomes a dominant invasive pest. Dependent on the season, the number of nests in the colony may alternately fuse into one or a few in winter and grow from spring, to reach maximum nest density in summer. Their early-season population growth is exponential. In general, T. sessile colonies move on a regular basis. They establish trails between nest and food resources, and to colonise new areas.
