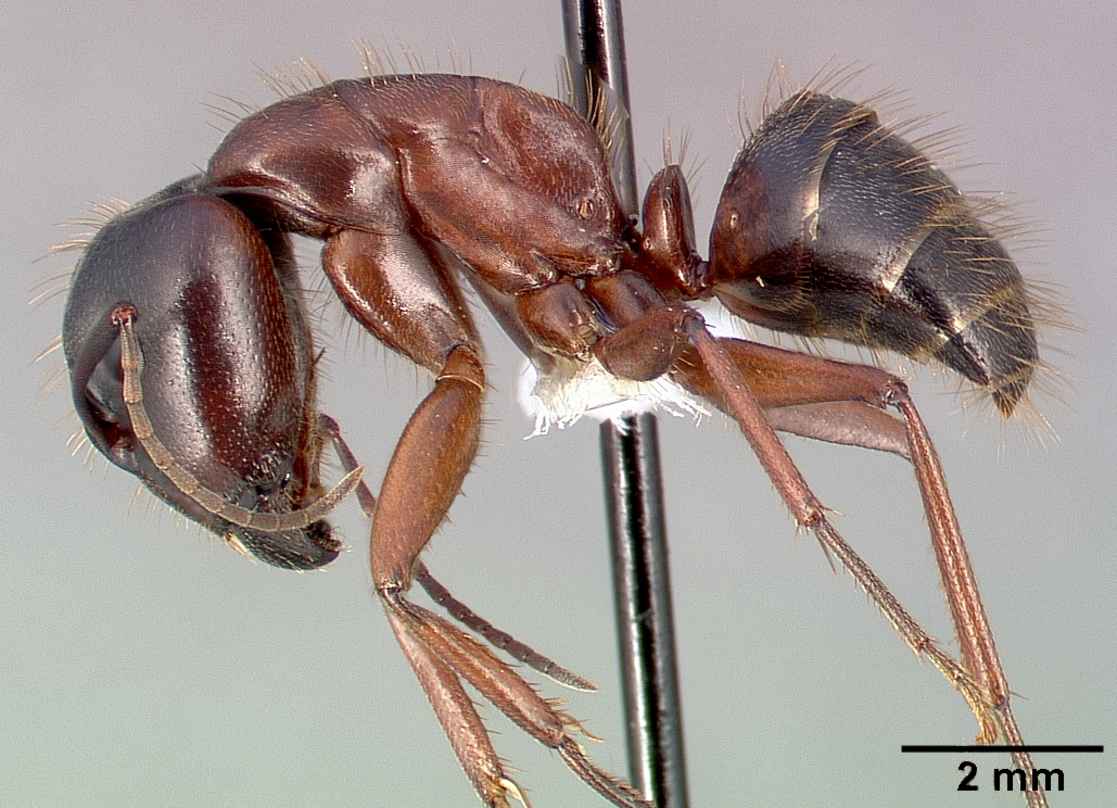

Scientific classification
- Kingdom: Animalia
- Phylum: Arthropoda
- Clade: Pancrustacea
- Class: Insecta
- Order: Hymenoptera
- Family: Formicidae
- Subfamily: Formicinae
- Genus: Camponotus
- Subgenus: Tanaemyrmex
- Species: C. dumetorum

Binomial name
- Camponotus dumetorum Wheeler, 1910

= Camponotus dumetorum =

Species of ant

Camponotus dumetorum is a species of carpenter ant native to North America. They are related to other species from the subgenus Tanaemyrmex in western North America such as C. semitestaceus and C. vicinus. C. dumetorum are primarily nocturnal and form nests underground. Like other select ant species native to California, their populations have been displaced with the introduction of Argentine ants.

== Anatomy ==
=== Worker ===
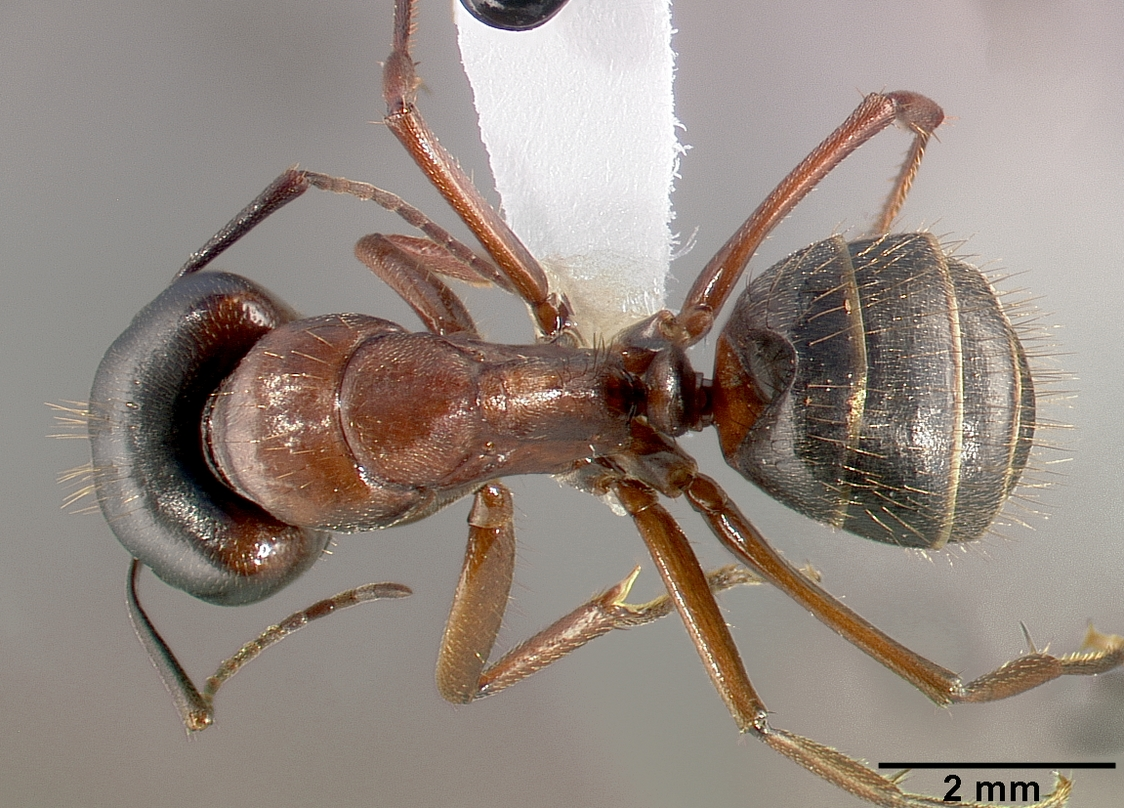
Dorsal view of C. dumetorum

==== Major ====
The average length of a major worker ant is 10–13 mm. They contain flattened lobes at the base of their scape. While the head and the gaster are black in coloration, the thorax and legs have a dull brown color. The clypeus is textured with piligerous punctures and this caste of workers is predominantly covered by hair (especially on the gaster).

==== Minor ====
The average length of a worker minor is 6–9 mm. Other than a head that is more brown and shaped differently than that of the worker major, the only other distinct difference between a worker minor and worker major is a larger lobe at the base of the worker minors' scapes.

=== Male ===
The average length of a male is 10–11 mm, and they share many of the same features as a male C. vicinus. However, their head appears less hairy, is reduced in length but greater in width, and have more visible frontal lobes at the base of the antennal scape. Their bodies are covered with stiff, yellow hairs and are generally dull in appearance with the exception of the gaster and legs. Compared to C. semitestaceus, they have larger petioles and longer occiputs. They are generally black in appearance with yellow wings.

== Distribution ==
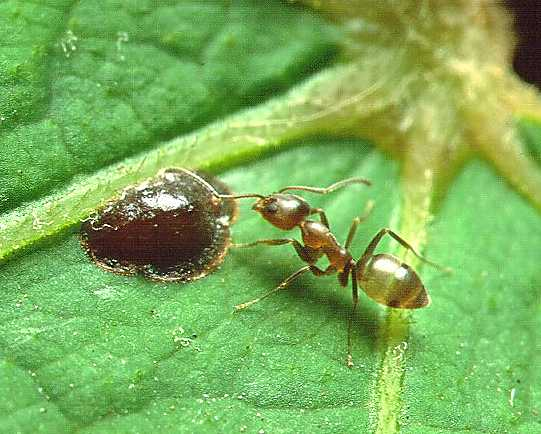
L. humile, or the Argentine ant, a nonnative species competing with C. dumetorum

Though C. dumetorum have been found in Baja California and California, their distribution is concentrated in the California floristic province. The presence of the non-native species L. humile, however, has displaced C. dumetorum and has consequently compromised their mutualistic relationship with other species.

== Ecological Impacts ==
C. dumetorum have been shown to have a facultative mutualistic relationship with Ferocactus viridescens by protecting the cactus from herbivores in exchange for extrafloral nectaries. The use of C. dumetorum as a potential deterrent to imported fire ants via competitive displacement has also been explored. Their potential candidacy is supported by the benefits they convey to the environment and to agriculture, and their larger size which may provide an advantage in outcompeting imported fire ants.
