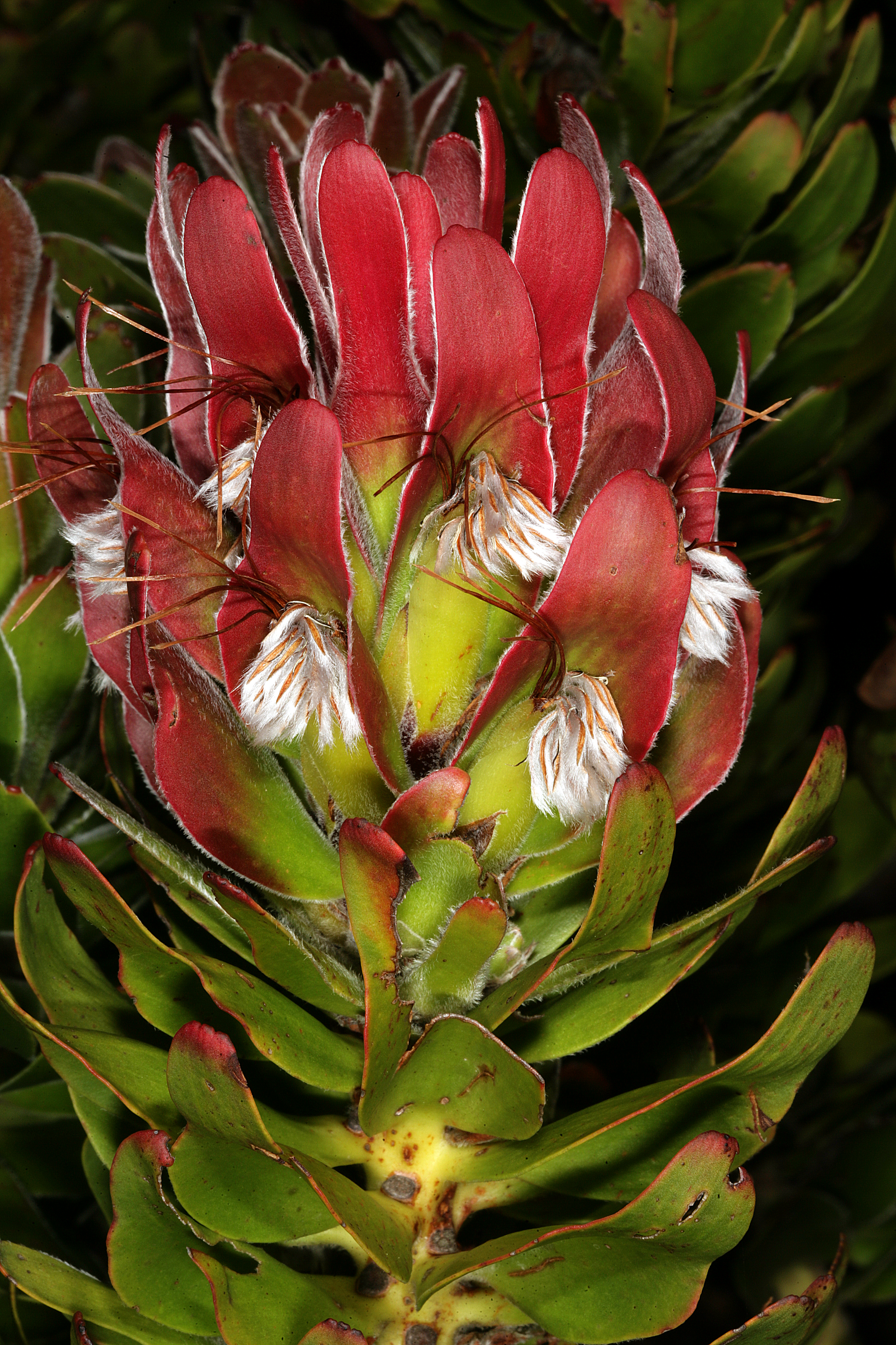

Conservation status
- Least Concern (IUCN 3.1)

Scientific classification
- Kingdom: Plantae
- Clade: Tracheophytes
- Clade: Angiosperms
- Clade: Eudicots
- Order: Proteales
- Family: Proteaceae
- Genus: Mimetes
- Species: M. fimbriifolius

Binomial name
- Mimetes fimbriifolius Salisb. ex Knight

Synonyms
- Protea cucullata β; M. hartogii, M. cucullatus var. hartogii

= Mimetes fimbriifolius =

Species of plant endemic to South Africa

Mimetes fimbriifolius, also called cowl pagoda or the fringed pagoda, is a species of plant in the family Proteaceae. It is a dense, rounded, multi-branched tree that grows up to 4 metres (13 ft) in height. This attractive and striking plant flowers all year round, and produces red and yellow branch-heads and inflorescences. The nectar-rich flowers are pollinated by sunbirds and the seeds are distributed and taken underground by ants before germinating. It is endemic to the Table Mountain range in the city of Cape Town, South Africa.

== Description ==
Mimetes fimbriifolius is a small tree of 2½–5 m (8–16 ft) high and can develop a crown of up to about 5 m across, that grows from a stout trunk of 25–60 cm (0.8–2.0 ft) thick, which is covered by an irregularly fissured, grey bark of up to 2½ cm (1 in) thick, that protects it from fire. From the trunk grow stocky stems of 1–1¼ cm (0.4–0.5 in) thick, that regularly branch and are initially covered in grey felty hairs, which gradually wear off with age. The leaves are set alternately along the branches, at an upward angle and overlapping. They have an oblong or elliptic to oblong outline, and are 4–7 cm (1.6–2.8 in) long and 1¼–2¼ cm (0.4–0.9 in) wide. They are abruptly cut off at its base and without a leaf stalk, have a blunt tip with three thickened teeth close together, the remainder of the margin entire but for a row of equal hairs along its length. The leaf surfaces are initially densely covered in felty hairs, but these wear off over time. The scarlet-coloured leaves that subtend the flower heads are fiddle-shaped and the sides curve downward, providing a hood for the flower head lower down the stem.

The inflorescences are broad cylinder-shaped, 6–8 cm (2.4–3.2 in) long and 6–7 cm (2.4–2.8 in) in diameter. The flower heads, which are in the axils of the higher leaves on the stems, each contain between four and seven individual flowers. The bracts that encircle the flower heads are unequal in size, clasp the base of the flowers tidily, are powdery hairy but felty near the base, and together form a two-lipped involucre. The two or three bracts below the attachment of the flowers are broadly ellipse-shaped with a pointy tip, and are larger, 3½–4 cm (1.4–1.6 in) long and 12–16 mm (0.48–0.64 in) wide. The bracts above the attachment of the flower heads are smaller, narrowly lance-shaped with a pointy tip, 1½–2½ cm (0.6–1.0 in) long and 3–5 mm (0.12–0.20 in) wide.

The bract subtending the individual flower is linear with to awl-shaped, about 10 mm (0.40 in) long and 1 mm (0.04 in) wide, and densely covered in silky hairs. The 4-merous perianth is 4–4½ cm (1.6–1.8 in) long. The lower part, that remains merged when the flower is open, is opaque, hairless, inflated, and about 3 mm (0.12 in) long. The four segments in the middle part (or claws) are line-shaped and powdery hairy. The segments in the upper part (or limbs), which enclosed the pollen presenter in the bud, are boat-shaped with a pointy tip and a felty outer surface. From the centre of the perianth emerges a style of 5½–6 cm (2.2–2.4 in) long. The thickened part at the tip of the style called pollen presenter is narrowly ellipse-shaped with a pointy tip, 8–10 mm (0.32–0.40 in) long, with a ring-shaped thickening at its base, and the sigmatic groove skewed. The oval ovary is silky hairy, 1–2 mm (0.04–0.08 in) long and difficult to differentiate from the style. It is subtended by four fleshy, awl-shaped scales of about 1½ mm (0.06 in) long. The one-seeded fruits are broadly egg-shaped, about 8 mm (0.32 in) long and 5 mm (0.20 in) wide.

=== Differences with related species ===
Mimetes fimbriifolius and Mimetes cucullatus differ from all other pagoda species by the gullet-type flower head. It functions in the same way as Acanthus and many Scrophulariaceae and Lamiaceae flowers. The bracts at the side of the stem are smaller, those in sight from the side are enlarged, while the leaf that is subtending the flower head above forms a brightly coloured hood. When the flowers open, the styles grow longer, break free from the perianth, and are pressed in the overhead leaf.

Mimetes fimbriifolius can easily be distinguished from M. cucullatus by its branching, tree-like habit, the fringe of white hairs along the edge of the leaves, and the longer leaves of 4–7 cm (1.6–2.8 in) long in M. fimbriifolius. M. cucullatus is a shrub with not or shyly branching stems that individually emerge from the ground, and the shorter leaves of 2½–5½ cm long lack a fringe of hairs.

== Taxonomy ==
The oldest known reference to the fringed pagoda was made by Herman Boerhaave, who described it as hypophyllocarpodendron; foliis lanuginosis; in apice trifido, rubro, quasi florescens [tree with fruits under the leaves, leaves woolly, tips with three teeth, red, like the inflorescence] in 1720. It was again described by Jean-Baptiste Lamarck in 1792, who called it Protea cucullata β. Richard Anthony Salisbury in a book by Joseph Knight titled On the cultivation of the plants belonging to the natural order of Proteeae, published in 1809, described the species and gave it the first proper Binomial nomenclature Mimetes fimbriifolius. In the following year, Robert Brown gave this species the name M. hartogii. In 1912, Edwin Percy Phillips, thought the fringed pagoda is no more than a form of the common pagoda and called it M. cucullatus var. hartogii. In 1984, John Patrick Rourke thought these names all referred to the same species, and should be treated as synonyms of Mimetes fimbriifolius.

=== Naming ===
The species name fimbriifolius is compounded from the Latin words fimbria, fringe, border or edge and folium leaf, together meaning with fringed leaves.

== Distribution, habitat and ecology ==
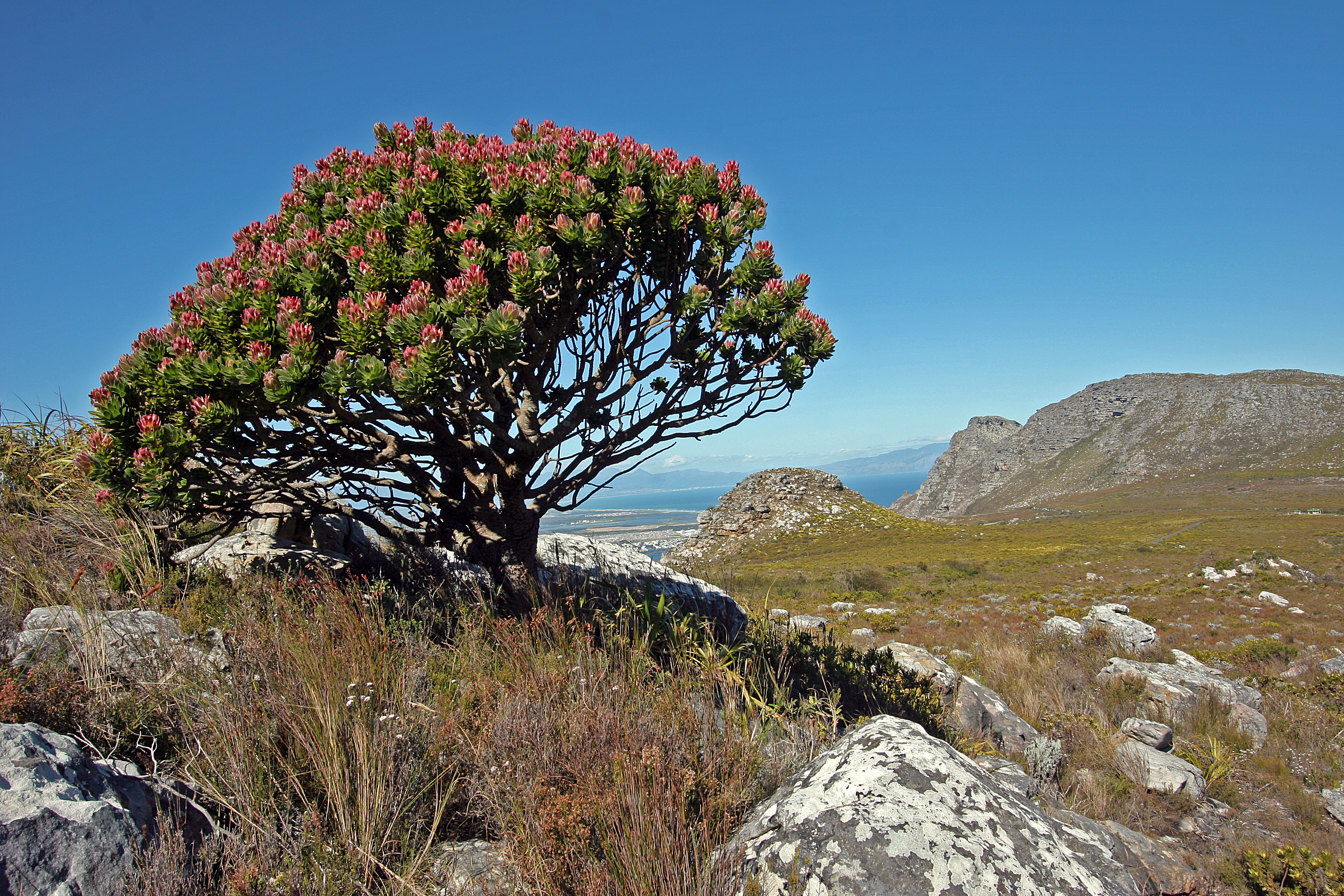
Habit of a specimen at Silvermine

The tree pagoda is an endemic species of the Cape Peninsula, from the Cape Point to the Table Mountain in the north. While it mostly occurs above 300 m (1000 ft) at its northern perimeter, it grows down to sea level in the south. The species has a preference for rocky slopes. The largest and well formed specimens grow on rocky outcrops, protected against the brunt of the wildfires that frequent the fynbos. Large specimens used to be very common on Table Mountain but harvesting for firewood and the spread of invasive alien plants have caused it to disappear from much of its former range.

== Ecology ==
Mimetes fimbriifolius is the largest and longest-living of all Mimetes species. Its bark is exceptionally fire-resistant, allowing it to survive the seasonal fires that naturally sweep across all Fynbos vegetation.

== Conservation ==
The tree pagoda is considered a rare species, due to its limited range of 395 km^{2} (153 sq mi) but stable population.

== See also ==
- Peninsula Sandstone Fynbos
- Biodiversity of Cape Town
