= Plagiolepis pissina =

Scientific classification
- Kingdom: Animalia
- Phylum: Arthropoda
- Clade: Pancrustacea
- Class: Insecta
- Order: Hymenoptera
- Family: Formicidae
- Subfamily: Formicinae
- Genus: Plagiolepis
- Species: P. pissina

Binomial name
- Plagiolepis pissina Roger, 1863

Species of ant

Plagiolepis pissina is a species of ant in the subfamily Formicinae. It is found in Sri Lanka.
