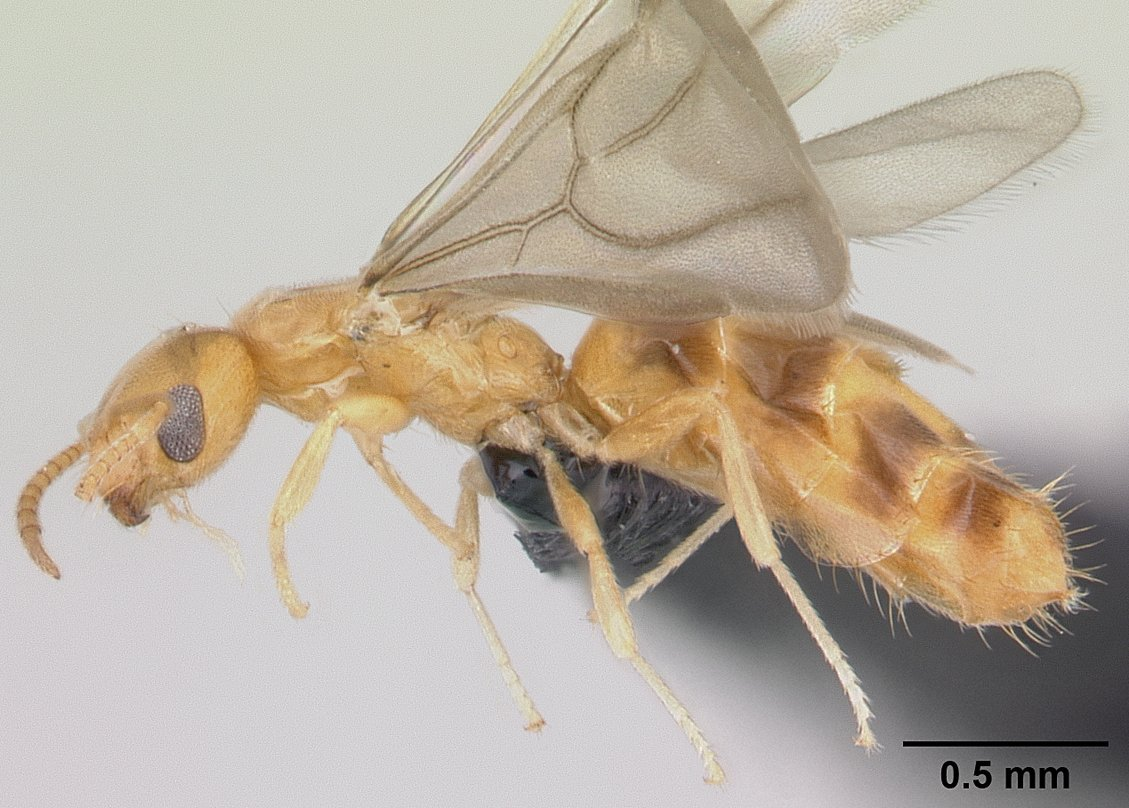
- Profile of P. alluaudi from AntWeb

Scientific classification
- Kingdom: Animalia
- Phylum: Arthropoda
- Class: Insecta
- Order: Hymenoptera
- Family: Formicidae
- Subfamily: Formicinae
- Genus: Plagiolepis
- Species: P. alluaudi

Binomial name
- Plagiolepis alluaudi Emery, 1894

Synonyms
- Plagiolepis augusti; Plagiolepis foreli; Plagiolepis mactavishi; Plagiolepis ornata

= Plagiolepis alluaudi =

Species of ant

Plagiolepis alluaudi, the little yellow ant, is a species of Plagiolepis. The species is native to Madagascar, an island off the coast of East Africa. It is known to be a widespread invasive species. In an effort to distinguish its name from other small and yellow species of ant it may be called Alluaud's little yellow ant, after Charles A. Alluaud.

== Physical description ==
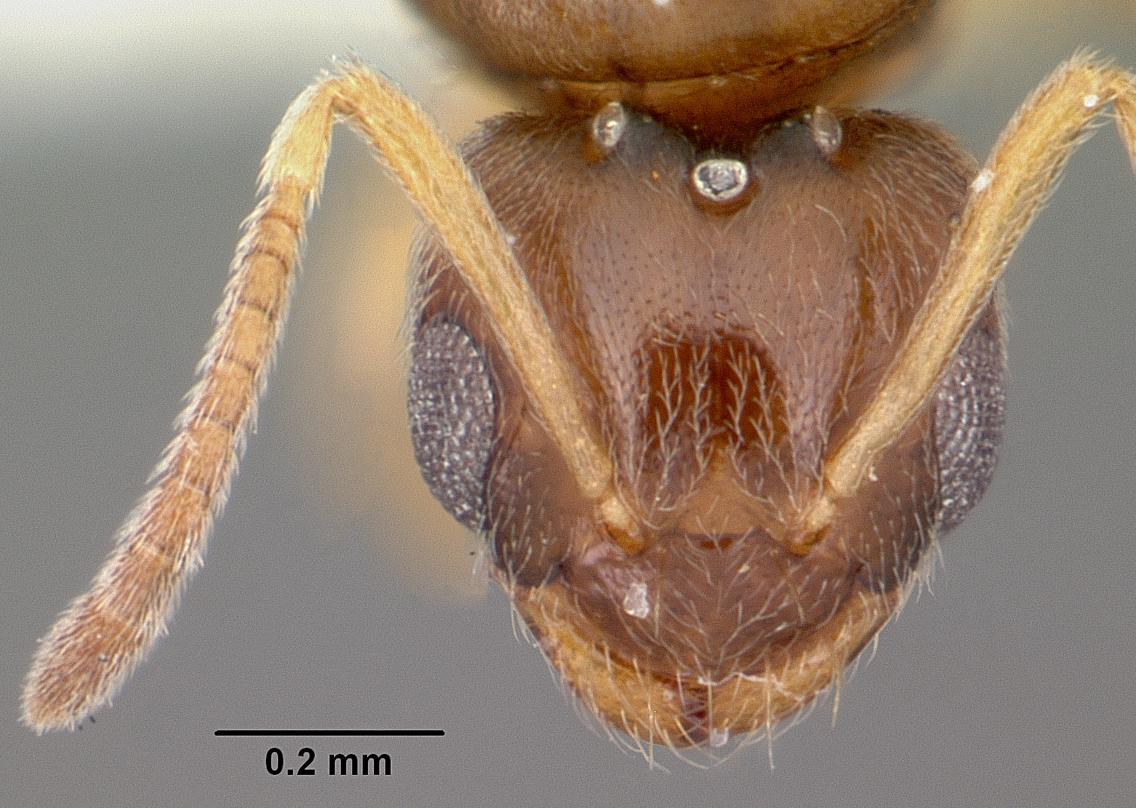
Head of P. alluaudi, showing antennal segments

Plagiolepis alluaudi is a very small ant averaging 1/16 of an inch (1.6 mm) in total length. It is yellow in color, has a rounded head, and has eleven antennal segments. The only other yellow ant in the genus Plagiolepis is P. exigua, which has an oblong head. P. alluaudi may also be confused with workers of the genus Brachymyrmex, which have nine antennal segments.

== Ecology ==
Plagiolepis alluaudi consumes honeydew, a product of plant sap that is produced by insects such as aphids, mealybugs, and scale insects. P. alluaudi is known to protect these insect species—which are often agricultural pests—from predators, going so far as to raise the pests' offspring in their nest until the larvae reach adulthood.

Colonies of P. alluaudi contain thousands of egg-laying queen ants, forming supercolonies.

== Human interaction ==
Plagiolepis alluaudi is not known to bite or sting humans. However, it can be a threat to agricultural crops, such as citrus, by protecting other insect species that transmit disease. P. alluaudi may also enter human homes to eat sweet foods. Established colonies are difficult to eradicate, but placing ant baits outside may eliminate parts of a large colony at one time.

=== As an invasive species ===
Plagiolepis alluaudi is generally introduced on land to which they are not native via shipping lanes. It has been documented in England, Germany, Switzerland, the Pacific Islands, Catalina Island (California), Hawaii, and the Caribbean. P. alluaudi is considered a pest on Pacific islands and in European greenhouses. In 2017, established colonies of the species were found in Fort Lauderdale, Florida. The species will likely thrive there due to the warm and moist climate of South Florida.

== Sources ==
- Fleshler, David (November 2, 2017). "Nasty little yellow ant establishes first U.S. colonies in Fort Lauderdale". Sun-Sentinel. Archived from the original on 2017-11-03.
- Wetterer, James K (2013). "Worldwide spread of Alluaud's little yellow ant, Plagiolepis alluaudi (Hymenoptera: Formicidae)". Myrmecol. News. 19: 53–59. ISSN 1994-4136 – via ResearchGate.
