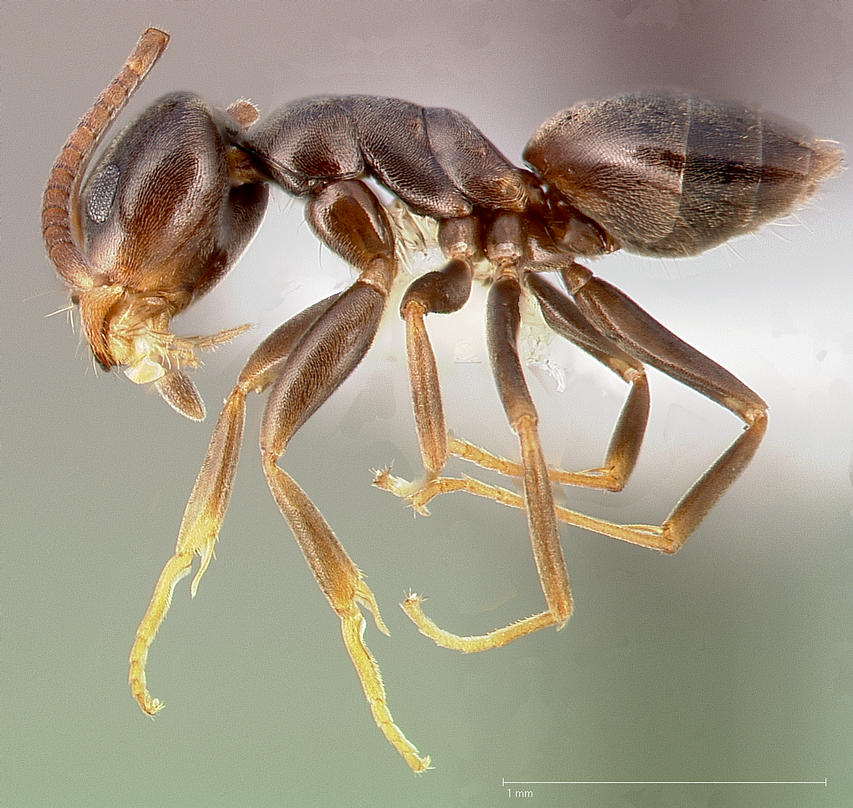
- Tapinoma sessile worker

Scientific classification
- Kingdom: Animalia
- Phylum: Arthropoda
- Clade: Pancrustacea
- Class: Insecta
- Order: Hymenoptera
- Family: Formicidae
- Subfamily: Dolichoderinae
- Genus: Tapinoma
- Species: T. sessile

Binomial name
- Tapinoma sessile Say, 1836

= Tapinoma sessile =

Species of ant

Tapinoma sessile is a species of small ant that goes by the common names odorous house ant, sugar ant, stink ant, and coconut ant. Their colonies are polydomous (consisting of multiple nests) and polygynous (containing multiple reproducing queens). Like many social insects, T. sessile employs complex foraging strategies, allocates food depending on environmental conditions, and engages in competition with other insects.

T. sessile can be found in a huge diversity of habitats, including within houses. They forage mainly for honeydew, which is produced by aphids and scale insects that are guarded and tended by the ants, as well as floral nectar and other sugary foods. They are common household pests and are attracted to sources of water and sweets.

Tapinoma sessile have long been suspected of exhibiting cloning behaviors similar to those observed in black crazy ants. This hypothesis has recently been confirmed through experimental evidence. In a notable experiment conducted by Marcello Ponzo, a colony consisting of seven queens and approximately 3,000 to 4,000 workers was kept in a controlled outworld and nest environment after being captured from the wild. Within a period of almost two months, the colony increased its number of queens from seven to ten under optimal conditions and a nutritious diet. This observation provides strong evidence supporting the theory of cloning in Tapinoma sessile.

Like other ants, T. sessile is eusocial. This is characterized by reproductive division of labor, cooperative care of the young, and the overlapping of multiple generations.

== Etymology ==
The binomial name Tapinoma sessile was assigned by Thomas Say in 1836. Sessile translates to "sitting" which probably refers to the gaster sitting directly on top of the petiole in the abdomen of the species.

The common names "odorous house ant" and "coconut ant" come from the odor the ants produce when crushed, which is very similar to the pungent odor of a rotting coconut, blue cheese, or turpentine.

== Description ==
T. sessile is a small ant that ranges in color from brown to black, and varies in length from 1/16 to 1/8 inches (1.5–3.2 mm). When crushed, these ants leave a smell which leads to their nickname "stink ant".

The gaster portion of the abdomen sits directly on top of the petiole in the abdomen of this species, which helps distinguish them from other small, dark, invasive ants. A comparison of the side view of T. sessile (below) and a diagram of the a typical ant body (below) shows how T. sessile’s gaster sits atop its petiole. This leads to a very small petiole and to the gaster being pointed downward. The anal pore then opens ventrally (toward the abdomen) instead of distally. Their antennae have 12 segments.

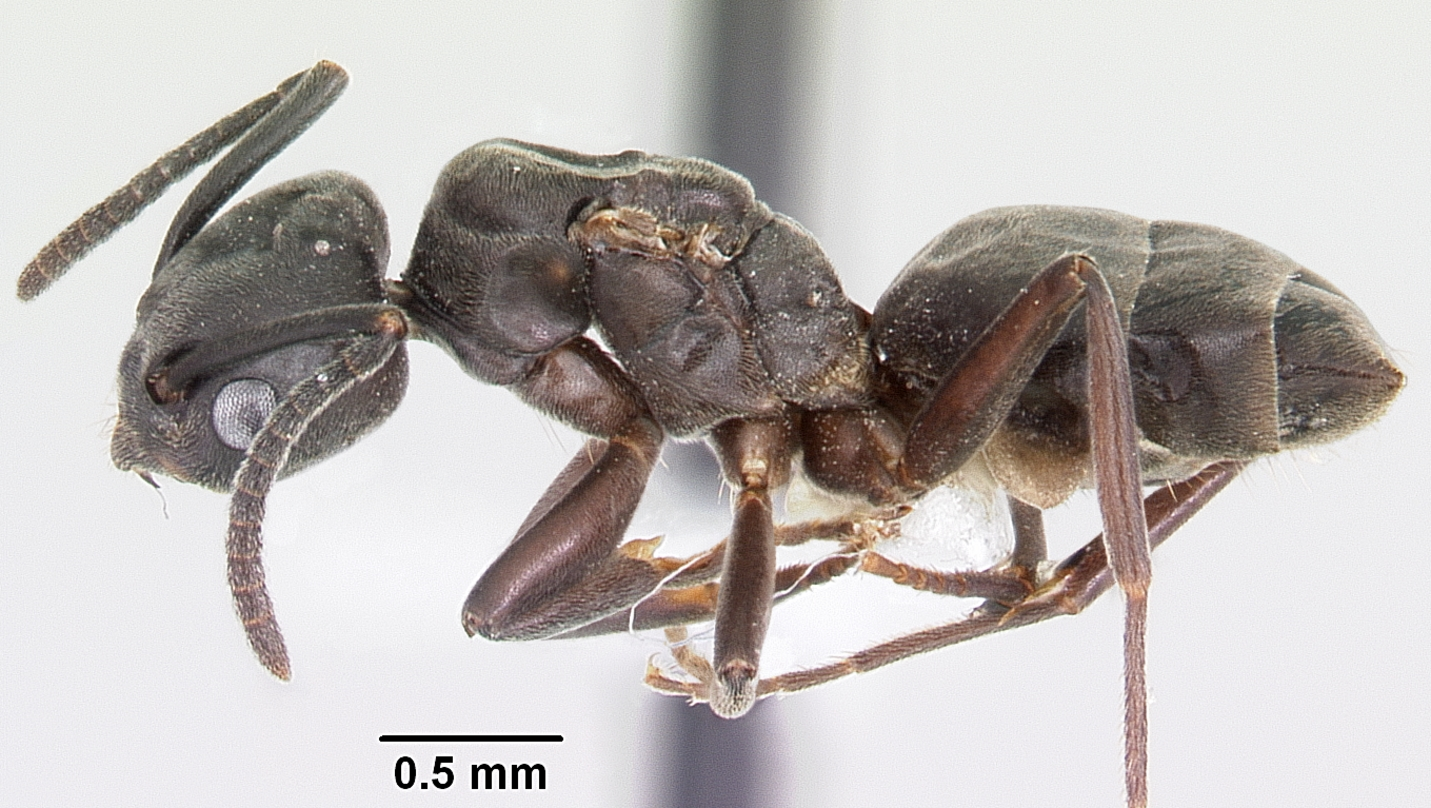
A side view of the body of T. sessile. It shows that the gaster part of the abdomen is directly above the ant's petiole.

A diagram showing the names of the different sections of a typical ant's body. Note that the petiole in this "typical ant" is in front of the gaster, rather than under it.

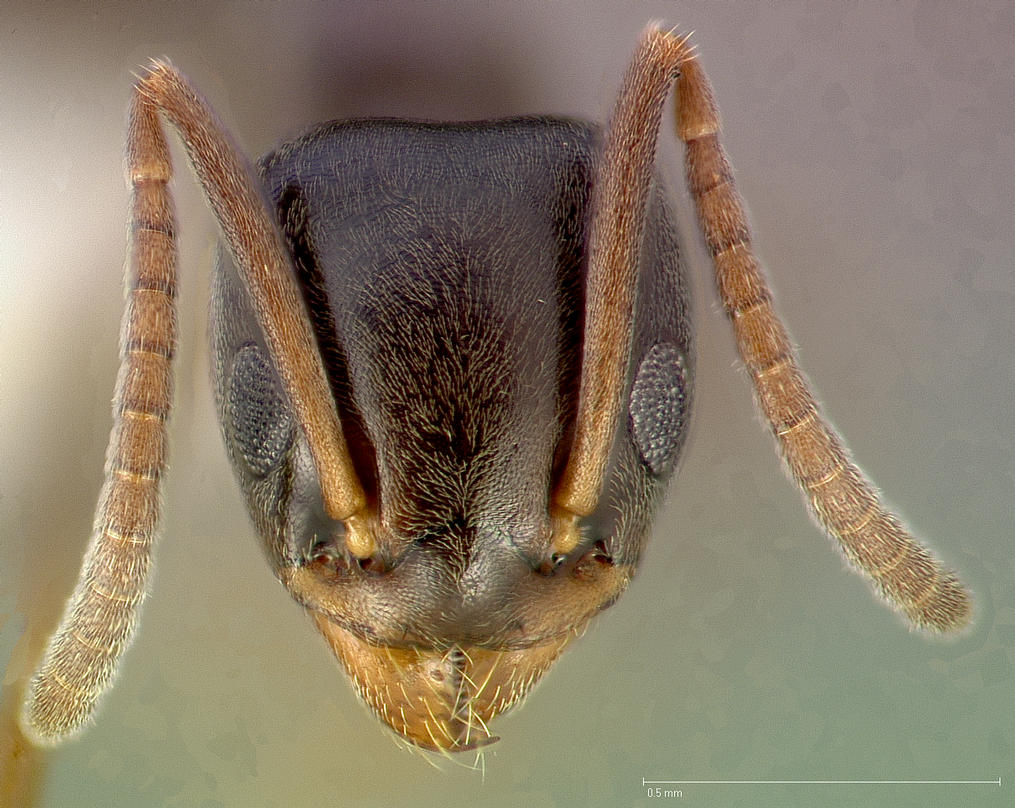
The antennae of T. sessile has 12 distinct segments

The queens lay the eggs which incubate between 11 and 26 days. After hatching, the larval stage lasts between 13 and 29 days, and the pre-pupal and pupal stages last between 10 and 24 days. Little is known about the lifespan of the ant, though it has been shown that queens live at least 8 months (and probably much longer), workers at least a few months (and show every indication of living as long as queens), while males appear to live only approximately a week.

== Distribution ==
T. sessile is native to North America and ranges from southern Canada to northern Mexico, but is less common in the desert southwest.

== Behavior ==
Colonies vary in size from a few hundred to tens of thousands of individuals. Big colonies usually have multiple queens.

The odorous house ant is tough: Injured workers have been observed to continue living and working with little hindrance, some queens with crushed abdomens still lay eggs, and there are documented instances of T. sessile queens surviving without food or water for over two months. They also appear highly tolerant to heat and cold. These ants are difficult to remove from a home after their colony has become well-established.

When offered a choice of food sources, the ants preferred sugar and protein over lipids, and this preference persisted in all seasons. When specific sugar sources were studied the ants preferred sucrose over other sugars, such as fructose or glucose.

=== Food allocation ===
Foragers collect food that is around the nest area and bring it back to the colony to share with the other ants. T. sessile has polydomous colonies, meaning that one colony has multiple nests. Because of this, T. sessile is very good at foraging for food when there is great variance in the distribution of resources. Instead of going back to a faraway nest to deliver food, they move workers, queens, and the brood to be closer to the food, so that they can reduce the cost in effort of food transport. This is called 'dispersed central-place foraging'. It was also found that the half-life of the stay at any one nest was about 12.9 days.

Buczkowski and Bennett also studied the pattern of food movement within a nest. They labeled sucrose with Immunoglobin G (IgG) proteins, and then identified them using an enzyme-linked immunosorbent assay (ELISA) to track the movement of food. They found that food was spread through trophallaxis (one animal regurgitating food for another). Despite this trophallactic spread of food, the workers kept most of the sucrose. They also found that some queens received more food than others, suggesting a dominance hierarchy even between queens. They also found that the nests were located in a system of trails, and that their distribution depended on where food was found and the distance between these patches of food. It was also found that the rate of trophallactic feeding depends on the number of ants per nest, and the quality of food available. When the number of donors is kept constant, but the number of total individuals is increased, more individuals test positive for the food marker. This indicates that more individuals are eating, but the amount they eat is less. If the number of donors was doubled, and the size of the overall population increased, the number of individuals receiving food more than doubled, again indicating that the number of individuals fed increased, but that the per capita amount of food consumed decreased.

When searching for food, primary orientation is when ants are exploring a new terrain without the guidance of odor trails. Secondary orientation is when terrain has been explored, and there are pre-existing odor trails which ants use to orient themselves. When T. sessile ants are orienting themselves for the first time they often rely on topography. The major types of elements they rely on are bilaterally elevated, bilaterally depressed, unilaterally elevated, and unilaterally depressed. They use these types of surfaces to orient along, and lay the first odor trails, which can then be followed in the future, to the food source, by other ants.

=== Seasonal behaviors ===
It was also found that this ant species practices seasonal polydomy (having multiple colony sites) to have access to multiple food sources. The colony will overwinter in a single nest, and then during spring and summer when resources are more abundant they will form multiple nests. This allows them to better use food sources, that might be spread out. During the winter they will return again to the same nest location. Seasonal polydomy is rather rare, and only found in 10% of all polydomous species. Seasonal polydomy is not found in many ant species, but there are many ant species, including T. sessile, which move within a season: Migration to better forage sites is common.

Seasonal activity patterns of the ants were also studied, and corresponding to the seasonal polydomy, it was observed that the ants displayed the most activity between March and September and displayed almost no activity from October to December. Daily activity patterns were also studied. In March T. sessile foraged during the day, but in April that pattern changed and the ant began to forage during both day and night. During most of the summer, T. sessile shows low levels of activity throughout the day and night.

=== Competition with other ants ===
Competition between species is often classified as exploitation or interference. Exploitation involves finding and using limited resources before they can be used by other species, while interference is the act of preventing others from getting resources by more direct force or aggression. When it comes to these behaviors, a species is considered dominant if it initiates an attack and subordinate if it avoids other species. In comparison with eight other ant species, T. sessile was more subordinate on the dominant to subordinate scale. The ant does not show a large propensity for attack, preferring to use chemical secretions instead of biting.

When T. sessile, a subordinate species, was in the presence of dominant ant species such as C. ferrugineus, P. imparis, Lasius alienus, and F. subsericea, they reduced the amount of time spent foraging. This was tested with the use of bait, and when the subordinate species, such as T. sessile, encountered a dominant species they would leave the bait. It would then make sense that the subordinate species would forage at a different time than dominant species, so that they could avoid confrontation, but there is sizable overlap in foraging period on a daily and seasonal basis. Because T. sessile forages at the same time as dominant species, but avoids other foraging ants, they must have excellent exploitative abilities to survive.

One of the invasive species that T. sessile has had to contend with is the Argentine ant (Linepithema humile). Studies of its interactions with L. humile has helped researchers better understand the aggression of T. sessile. T. sessile ants rarely fight alongside their nest-mates: They only were observed to have fought collectively in six of forty interactions. This often caused T. sessile to lose altercations with other ant species, such as L. humile, even when more T. sessile individuals were present. Whereas other ant species like L. humile fight together, T. sessile do not. T. sessile is, however, more likely to win in one-on-one interactions because they have effective chemical defenses.

=== Other habits ===
This species is a scavenger / predator ant that will eat most household foods, especially those that contain sugar, as well as other insects. Indoors they will colonize near heat sources or in insulation. In hot and dry situations, nests have been found in house plants and even in the lids of toilets. Outdoors they tend to colonize under rocks and exposed soil. They appear, however, to form colonies virtually anywhere, in a variety of conditions.

In experiments where T. sessile workers were confined in an area without a queen, egg-laying (by the workers) was observed, though the workers destroyed any prepupa that emerged from the eggs.

Odorous house ants have been observed collecting honeydew to feed on from aphids, scale insects, and membracids.

They appear to be more likely to invade homes after rain (which washes away the honeydew they collect).

Odorous house ants appear to be highly tolerant of other ants, with compound nests consisting of multiple ant species that included T. sessile having been observed.

== Predators and parasites ==
Some birds and toads will eat odorous house ants on occasion.

Wheeler (1916) mentions Bothriomyrmex dimmocki as a possible parasite of odorous house ant colonies, suggesting that B. dimmocki queens invade and replace T. sessile queens.

Isobrachium myrmecophilum (a small wasp) appears to parasitize odorous house ants.

== Pest control ==
T. sessile are not hard to control; they are vulnerable to most ant-killers, which are especially effective when applied as soon as their presence is noticed. If dealt with early, their numbers can be brought under control in just a few days. However, the longer a colony is ignored, the larger the population becomes and the longer it will take to clear the infestation – possibly a few weeks. These ants most commonly invade buildings in late winter and early spring (particularly after rain), at which times one should be on the lookout for newly arrived ants foraging indoors.

To discourage immigration, standing water should be eliminated in the house, as T. sessile are attracted to moisture. Plants should be trimmed away from buildings, so they do not make convenient routes for above-ground entry. Cracks, holes and joints should be sealed with polyurethane foam or caulk, especially those that are near the ground. Firewood, rocks, and other materials should not be stored next to a home because it provides sites for nest building near the home, and T. sessile naturally relocate their colonies to be near successful forage sites.
