= Plagiolepis ampeloni =

Conservation status
- Vulnerable (IUCN 2.3)

Scientific classification
- Kingdom: Animalia
- Phylum: Arthropoda
- Class: Insecta
- Order: Hymenoptera
- Family: Formicidae
- Subfamily: Formicinae
- Genus: Plagiolepis
- Species: P. ampeloni

Binomial name
- Plagiolepis ampeloni (Faber, 1969)

Species of ant

Plagiolepis ampeloni is a species of ant in genus Plagiolepis. It is native to Austria.
