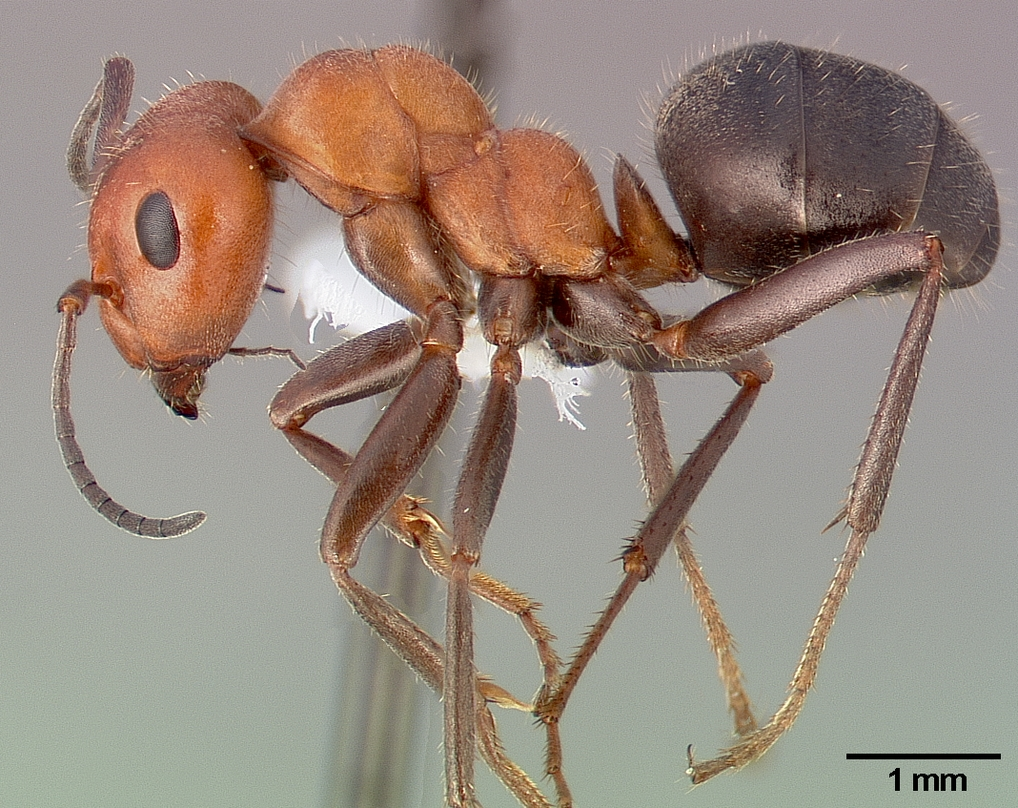
- F. obscuripes worker

Scientific classification
- Kingdom: Animalia
- Phylum: Arthropoda
- Clade: Pancrustacea
- Class: Insecta
- Order: Hymenoptera
- Family: Formicidae
- Subfamily: Formicinae
- Genus: Formica
- Species: F. obscuripes

Binomial name
- Formica obscuripes Forel, 1886

= Formica obscuripes =

Species of ant

Formica obscuripes, the western thatching ant, is a species of ant in the family Formicidae. It is native to North America. It builds large mounds covered by small pieces of plant material. The number of adult workers per colony may reach up to 40,000. F. obscuripes feeds on various insect species, consumes nectar from homopterous insects they tend, and occasionally consumes plant tissue.

== Biology ==
=== Colonies ===
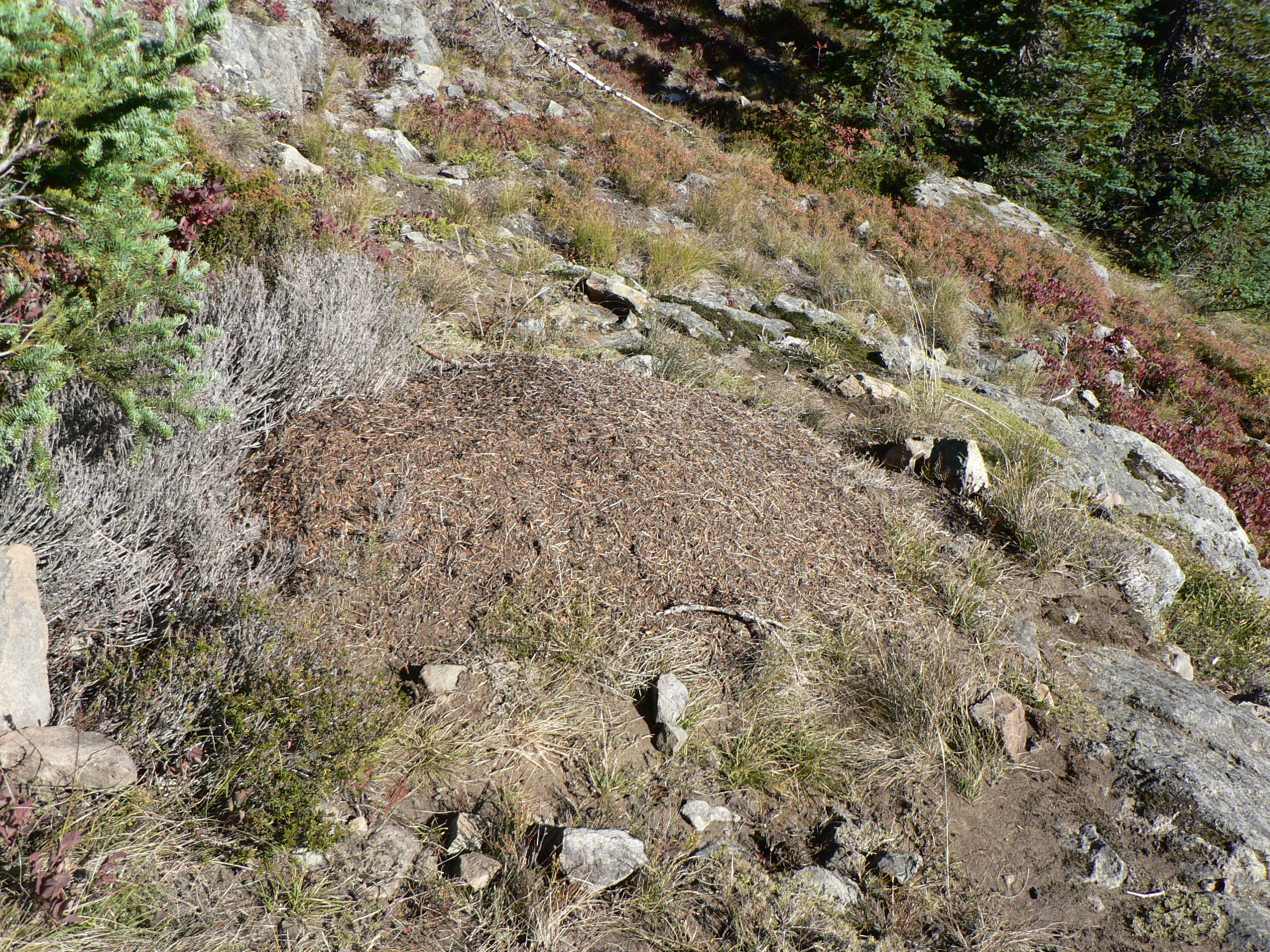
mound

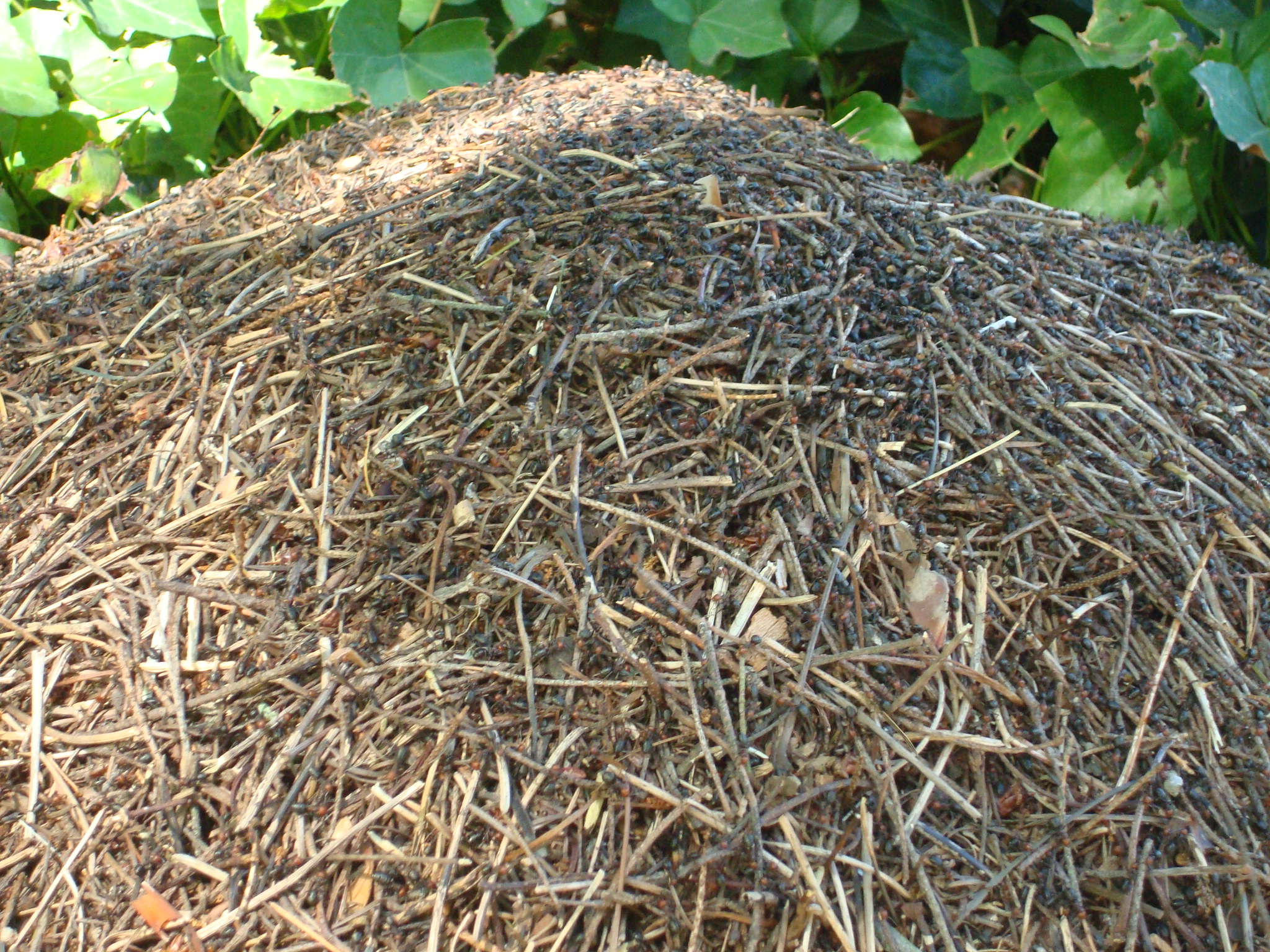
mound (close-up)

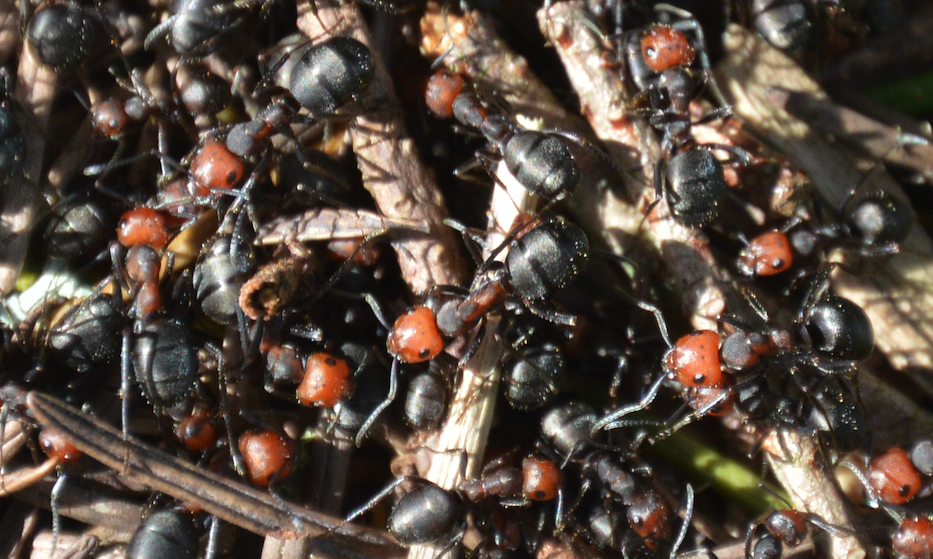
mound with workers

F. obscuripes creates distinctive dome-shaped mounds composed of varying materials found in the surrounding environment, primarily vegetation. The building material is commonly called "thatch". The mounds are typically constructed in areas devoid of cover, so that the nest is exposed to sunlight. The size of the mounds is highly variable, and is mostly determined by the age and health of the colony; they generally range in height from 1 to 18 inches (2.5–46 cm), although taller ones are not uncommon. A colony can also extend as much as 4 ft (1.2 m) below ground level, with chambers present in both the thatched mound and the soil. The thatched mound is in a constant state of change as it is affected by the environment and the ants keep repairing and modifying it. To prevent plants from shading the nest, the ants may chew off the bark at the base of plants growing on or near the mound and spray formic acid into the open layer, eventually killing and felling the plants.

In the Blue Mountains of Oregon, F. obscuripes has demonstrated the capacity for polydomy. A supercolony in a 4-hectare (10-acre) study area near Lehman Hot Springs consisted of 210 active nests with an estimated population in excess of 56 million ants.

=== Chemistry ===
The liquid sprayed by Formica obscuripes consists of formic acid, eight straight-chain alkanes, a branched-chain alkane and five alkenes. The major component, formic acid, has been found to vary from 8% to 96% and average 73% of the volatiles in the secretion. Variation was also seen with the second most abundant compound, undecane, which ranged from 3% to 63% of the secretion and averaged 19%. Undecane is known to be a signaling chemical for some types of ants.

== Distribution ==
F. obscuripes is found in a variety of habitats in North America, particularly the United States of America. Most specimens are collected from the Midwest or from between the Rocky Mountains and the American west coast. Populations in the Pacific Northwest may have an unusual number of erect setae on their antennae and have been described by hobbyists as typically producing larger colonies and mounds than populations elsewhere, though this has not been confirmed. Pacific Northwest populations are additionally distinguished by the unique coloration of the gynes, which sport entirely black bodies with red heads.

== Taxonomy ==
Formica obscuripes may include the questionably distinct species F. planipilis, which is said to be distinguished by characteristics of the setae and the head shape of the workers.
