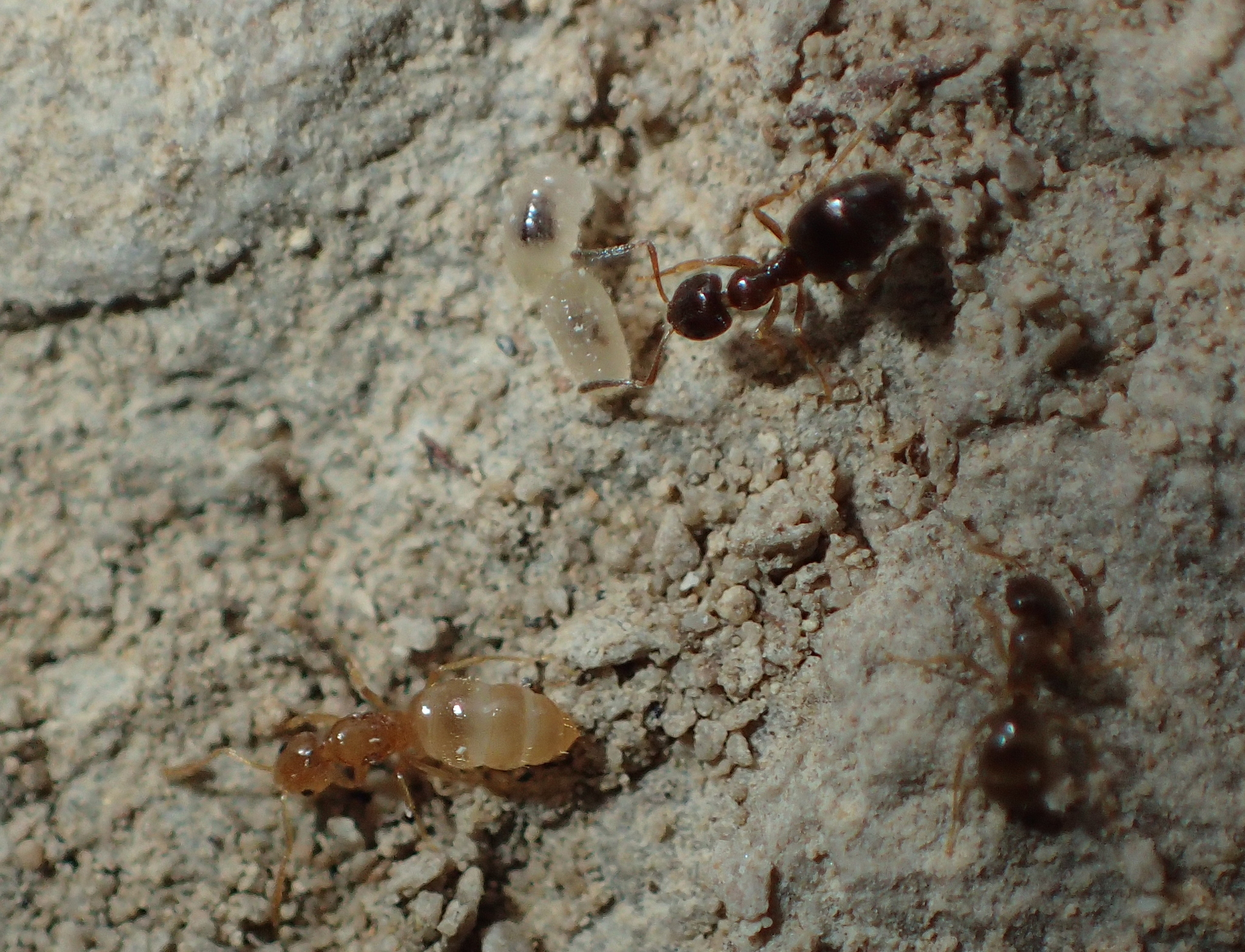

Conservation status
- Vulnerable (IUCN 2.3)

Scientific classification
- Kingdom: Animalia
- Phylum: Arthropoda
- Class: Insecta
- Order: Hymenoptera
- Family: Formicidae
- Subfamily: Formicinae
- Genus: Plagiolepis
- Species: P. grassei

Binomial name
- Plagiolepis grassei Le Masne, 1956

= Plagiolepis grassei =

Species of ant

Plagiolepis grassei is a species of ant in genus Plagiolepis. It is native to France.
