= Plagiolepis regis =

Conservation status
- Vulnerable (IUCN 2.3)

Scientific classification
- Kingdom: Animalia
- Phylum: Arthropoda
- Class: Insecta
- Order: Hymenoptera
- Family: Formicidae
- Subfamily: Formicinae
- Genus: Plagiolepis
- Species: P. regis

Binomial name
- Plagiolepis regis Karavaiev, 1931

Species of ant

Plagiolepis regis is a species of ant in the genus Plagiolepis. It is native to Russia.
