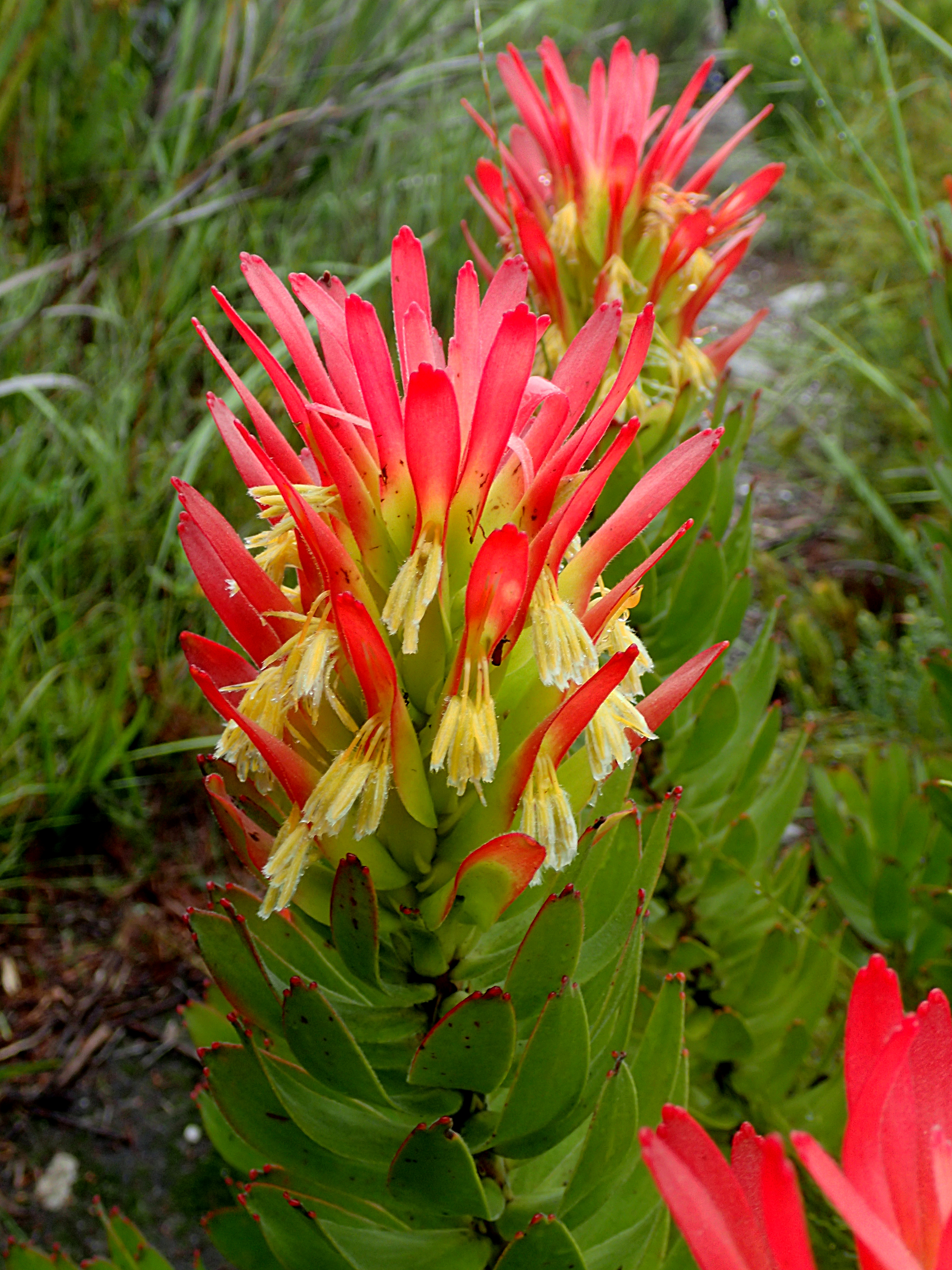

Conservation status
- Least Concern (IUCN 3.1)

Scientific classification
- Kingdom: Plantae
- Clade: Tracheophytes
- Clade: Angiosperms
- Clade: Eudicots
- Order: Proteales
- Family: Proteaceae
- Genus: Mimetes
- Species: M. cucullatus

Binomial name
- Mimetes cucullatus R.Br.

Synonyms
- Leucadendron cucullatum, Protea cucullata; Mimetes lyrigera; M. cucullatus var. brevifolia; M. cucullatus var. ludwigii, Mimetes ludwigii; M. mixta; M. cucullatus var. dregei, M. dregei; M. cucullatus forma laxa, M. laxa; M. schinziana

= Mimetes cucullatus =

Species of plant from South Africa

Mimetes cucullatus is an evergreen shrub with several, mostly not branching, upright stems of 1–2 m (3–7 ft) high, that has been assigned to the family Proteaceae. It is the most widespread and most common pagoda species that can cope with a relatively large range of environmental circumstances. It is known under several names including common pagoda in English and rooistompie in Afrikaans.

== Description ==
Mimetes cucullatus is an evergreen, upright shrub of 1–2 m (3–7 ft) high, that has a firm woody tuber in the ground, from which several stems rise. These stems are upright, 3–8 mm (0.12–0.32 in) thick, mostly not branching but occasionally forking, initially covered in grey felty hair, but this tends to wear off with age. The leaves are alternately set along the stems, very narrow to broad elliptic or inverted egg-shaped, 2½–5½ cm (1–2¼ in) long and ½–2 cm (0.2–0.8 in) wide. Young growth is scarlet coloured, turning green lower down the stem. The leaves that subtend the flower heads are inverted fiddle-shaped in outline, folded backwards from the midline out, and during flowering are scarlet in the upper parts, gradually turning through yellowish to green at the base or entirely yellowish with a green base or softly orange.

The inflorescence that consists of many flower heads in the axils of the highest leaves on the stem is cylindric in shape and 6–10 cm (2½–4 in) long and 4–7 cm (1⅔–2 in) in diameter, topped by a tuft of smallish, more or less upright, narrowly egg-shaped, scarlet coloured leaves. Each flower head contains four to seven flowers and is subtended by a leaf that is fiddle-shaped in outline and the side bent away from the stem as to cowl over the lower flower head. These leaves are mostly scarlet with some yellow and green at the very base or more rarely entirely yellow with the very base green, while intermediate soft orange forms also occur in the same populations. These leaves have an entire margin or have three teeth near their tips. The bracts that encircle the flower heads are unequal in size, clasp the base of the flowers tidily, fringed by a rim of silky hairs, and together form a two-lipped involucre. The bracts below the attachment of the flowers are ellipse-shaped with a pointy tip, larger, 1½–3 cm (0.6–1.2 in) long and 3–12 mm (0.12–0.48 in) wide. The bract above the attachment of the flower heads are smaller, lance-shaped with a pointy tip, 8–10 mm (0.32–0.40 in) long and 1½–3 mm (0.06–0.12 in) wide.

The bract subtending the individual flower is linear with a pointy tip to awl-shaped and 6–10 mm (0.24–0.40 in) long. The 4-merous perianth is 3½–4 cm (1.4–1.6 in) long and curved in the bud. The lower part, that remains merged when the flower is open, is hairless, inflated, and about 1 mm (0.04 in) long. The middle part (or claws), are each about 10 mm (0.4 in) wide, line-shaped, powdery to thinly silky hairy. The upper part (or limbs), which enclosed the pollen presenter in the bud, are line-shaped with a pointy tip, difficult to differentiate from te claws and densely silky hairy. From the centre of the perianth emerges a style of 4½–5 cm (1.8–2.0 in) long. The thickened part at the tip of the style called pollen presenter is line to awl-shaped, 5–7 mm (0.20–0.28 in) long, with a ring-shaped thickening at its base, a sharply pointy tip and the sigmatic groove across the middle. The oval ovary is densely silky hairy, about 1 mm long (0.04 in) subtended by four fleshy awl-shaped scales.

=== Differences with related species ===
Mimetes cucullatus and Mimetes fimbriifolius differ from all other pagoda species by the gullet-type flower head. It functions in the same way as Acanthus and many Scrophulariaceae and Lamiaceae flowers. The bracts at the side of the stem are smaller, those in sight from the side are enlarged, while the leaf that is subtending the flower head above forms a brightly coloured hood. When the flowers open, the styles grow longer, break free from the perianth, and are pressed in the overhead leaf.

M. fimbriifolius can easily be distinguished from M. cucullatus by its branching, tree-like habit, the fringe of white hairs along the edge of the leaves, and the longer leaves of 4–7 cm long in M. fimbriifolius. M. cucullatus is a shrub with not or shyly branching stems that individually emerge from the ground, and the shorter leaves of 2½–5½ cm long lack a fringe of hairs.

== Taxonomy ==
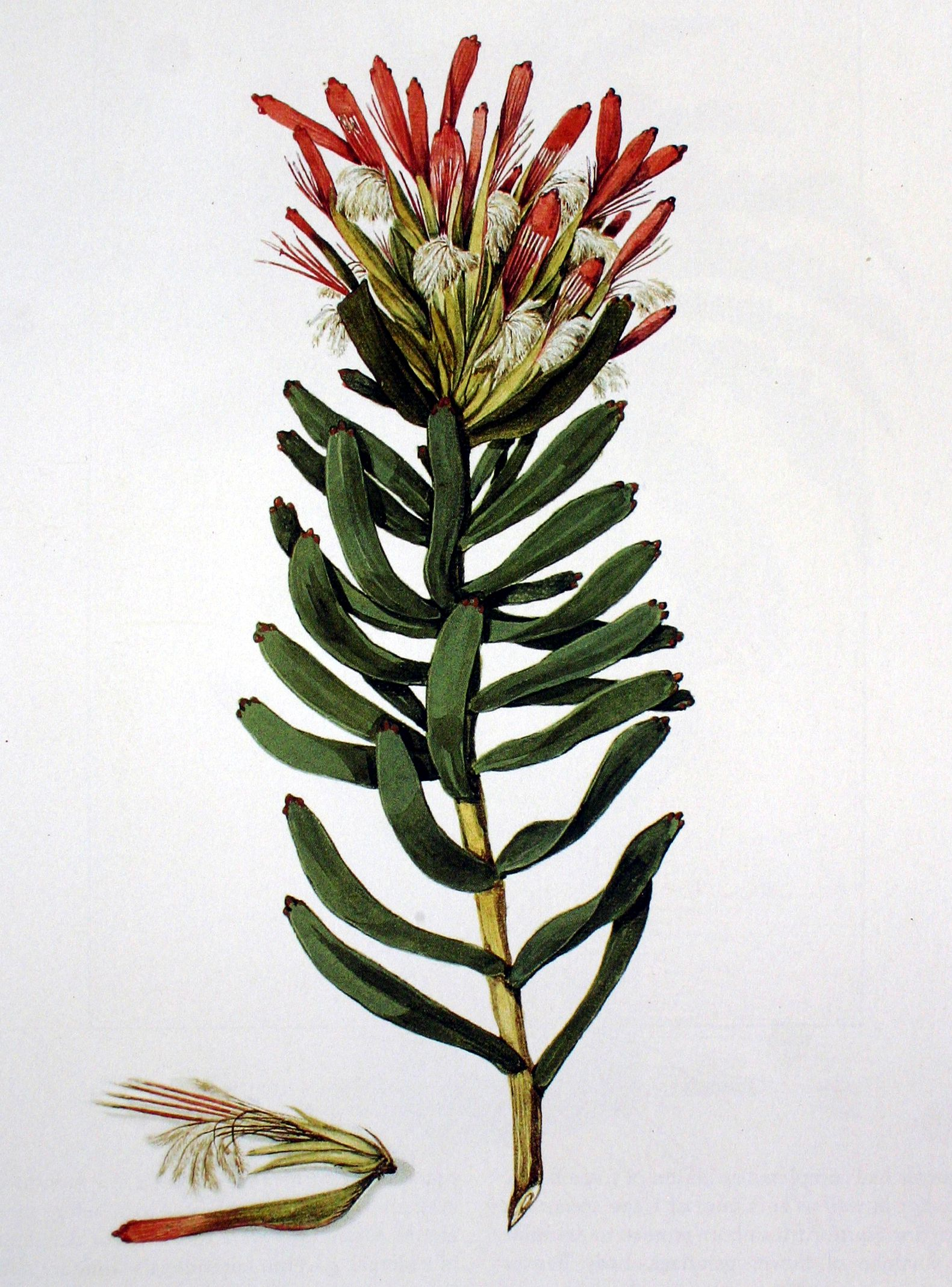
Watercolour from around 1700 possibly by Henrik Bernard Oldenland

The common pagoda was first mentioned by Leonard Plukenet in his Opera 2 (Amalgest.) of 1696, in which he describes it as Leucadendros Africana, s. Scolymocephalus, angustiori folio, apicibus tridentatis [African white tree with artichoke head, narrow leaves with tips having three teeth]. In 1753 Carl Linnaeus provided the first valid description and called it Leucadendron cucullatum, but he changed his opinion and in 1771 collapsed Leucadendron into Protea creating the new combination Protea cucullata. Richard Anthony Salisbury called the species Mimetes lyrigera in 1809, but his is an illegitimate name because he says it is identical to Leucadendron cucullatum, and he thus should have adopted the older species epithet. This was corrected in 1810 by Robert Brown, who created the correct combination Mimetes cucullatus. Carl Meissner, who contributed a section on the Proteaceae in 1856 to the series Prodromus Systematis Naturalis Regni Vegetabilis by Alphonse Pyramus de Candolle, recognized two slightly different forms calling them M. cucullatus var. brevifolia, and var. ludwigii. Ernst Gottlieb von Steudel created in the same publication M. ludwigii, but without a proper description. Michel Gandoger distinguished in 1901 three further forms as M. mixta, M. cucullatus var. dregei, and M. cucullatus forma laxa respectively. Gandoger and Hans Schinz in 1913 raised them to species level, creating M. dregei and M. laxifolia. In the same year Gandoger distinguished yet another form, creating M. schinziana. John Patrick Rourke considers the common pagoda a species with much variability, but found that the forms all grade into each other, and concludes all these names should be treated as synonyms of Mimetes cucullatus.

=== Names ===
Mimetes cucullatus is known as common pagoda, red pagoda, common mimetes or red mimetes in English, and rooistompie, or just stompie in Afrikaans. The species name cucullātus is Latin, means "hooded" and refers to the hood-like shape of the leaf that actually subtends the flower head higher up the stem. The name in Afrikaans stompie means stump. It may refer to its burt remains after a wildfire, but also to the squarely lopped off stems. Rooi is the Afrikaans word for red, and refers to the scarlet colour of new growth and the leaves that subtend the flower heads.

== Distribution ==
Mimetes cucullatus is the most widely distributed pagoda species, found from west of the Olifants River valley near Porterville in the north and the Cape Peninsula in the southwest, to the Langeberg range in the east. It is particularly common along the coast between Hangklip near Pringle Bay in the Kogelberg area to Bredasdorp. There are three isolated inland populations of M. cucullatus in the Kouga Mountains, Klein Swartberg and Rooiberg, an isolated mountain in the middle of the Little Karoo. Another isolated population occurs on the Potberg. This makes it likely that its distribution used to be larger than today but, with increasing drought, it became limited to areas that are wet enough today.

== Ecology ==
=== Adaptions to environment ===
This plant is a resprouter, which shoots up new growth from its base after a fire. This is unusual for Mimetes, as all other species are re-seeders; their seeds germinate after a fire, but mature plants are killed by fire.

It has proteoid or cluster roots, which enhance the uptake of nutrients, enabling it to grow in low nutrient soils.

=== Reproduction ===
This species, along with other members of the genus Mimetes, is adapted to bird pollination.

Mimetes cucullatus has special glands on the tips of its leaves called extrafloral nectaries, which attract ants. Ants may defend the plants against insect herbivores. In addition, ants are the main dispersers of M. cucullatus seeds.

== Conservation ==
The common pagoda is considered a species of least concern, due to it large distribution and stable population.

== Cultivation ==
Mimetes cucullatus is an unusual and beautiful plant. It is popular with people who have interest in indigenous plants and wildlife gardens.

Since M. cucullatus is a resprouter, it responds well to severe pruning, which makes it well suited as a cut-flower.
