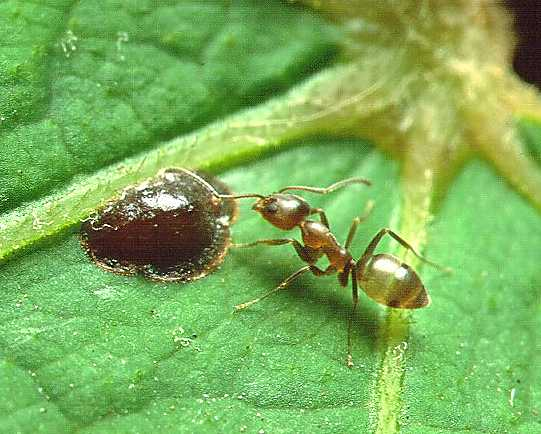

Scientific classification
- Kingdom: Animalia
- Phylum: Arthropoda
- Clade: Pancrustacea
- Class: Insecta
- Order: Hymenoptera
- Family: Formicidae
- Subfamily: Dolichoderinae
- Genus: Linepithema
- Species: L. humile

Binomial name
- Linepithema humile (Mayr, 1868)

= Argentine ant =

Species of ant

The Argentine ant (Linepithema humile, formerly Iridomyrmex humilis) is an ant native to northern Argentina, Uruguay, Paraguay, Bolivia and southern Brazil. This invasive species was inadvertently introduced by humans on a global scale and has become established in many Mediterranean climate areas, including South Africa, New Zealand, Japan, Easter Island, Australia, the Azores, Europe, Hawaii, and the continental United States. Argentine ants are significant pests within agricultural and urban settings, and are documented to cause substantial harm to communities of native arthropods, vertebrates, and plants within their invaded range.

== Description ==
Linepithema humile is a small-bodied (2.2–2.6 mm) ant species, dull light to dark brown in color. Within the invasion zone, ant colonies are large and include many workers and multiple queens.

Argentine ants are opportunistic with regard to nesting preferences. Colony nests have been found in the ground, in cracks in concrete walls, in spaces between boards and timbers, even among belongings in human dwellings. In natural areas, they generally nest shallowly in loose leaf litter or beneath small stones, due to their poor ability to dig deeper nests. However, if a deeper nesting ant species abandons their nest, Argentine ant colonies will readily take over the space. Because the native habitat for this species is within riparian floodplains, colonies are very sensitive to water infiltration within their nests; if their nests become inundated with water, workers will collect the brood and the entire colony will move to dry ground.

Austrian entomologist Gustav L. Mayr identified the first specimens of Hypoclinea humilis in the vicinity of Buenos Aires, Argentina in 1866. This species was shortly transferred to the genus Iridomyrmex, and finally to Linepithema in the early 1990s.

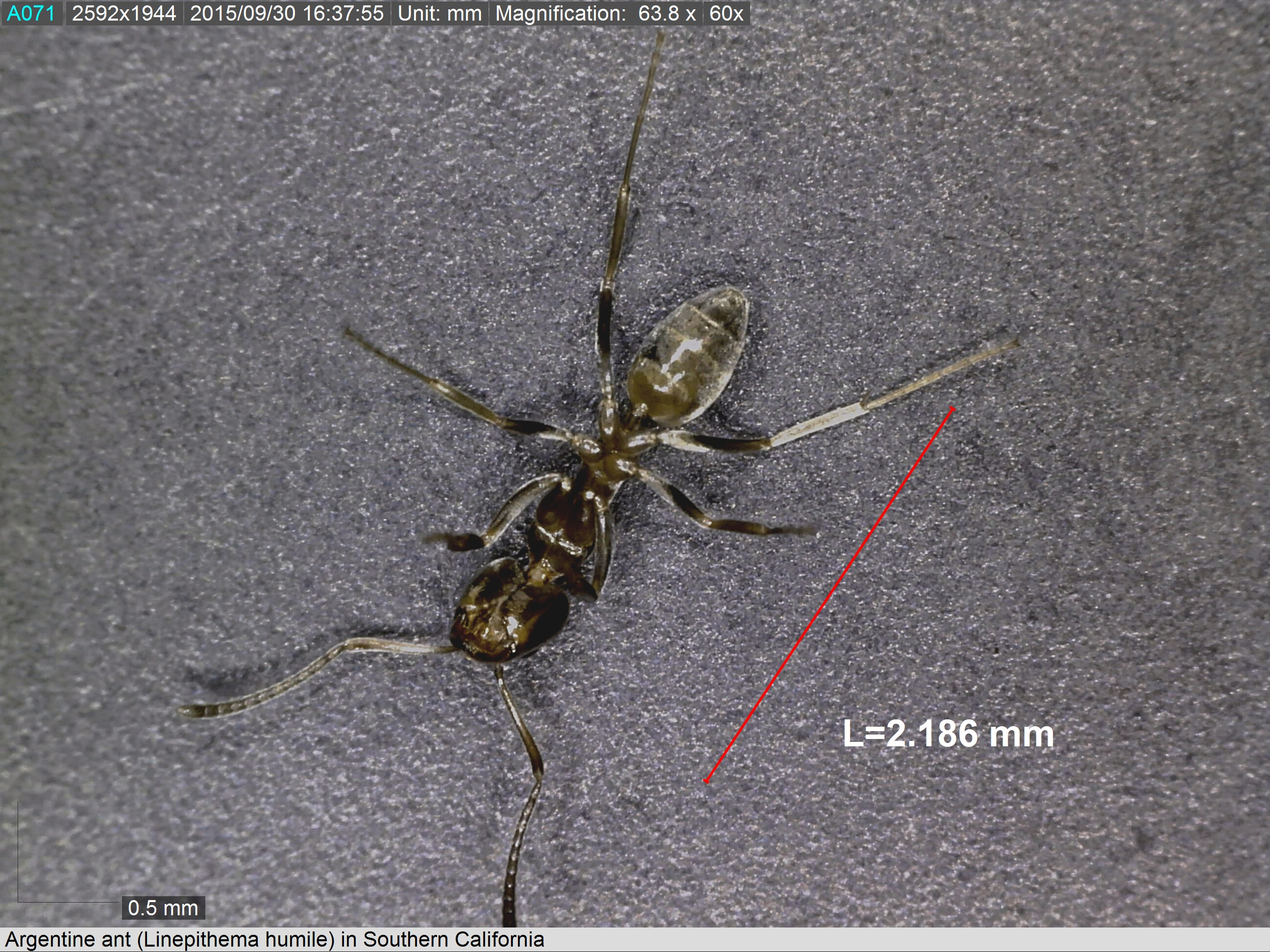
Typical size of worker ants found in Southern California.

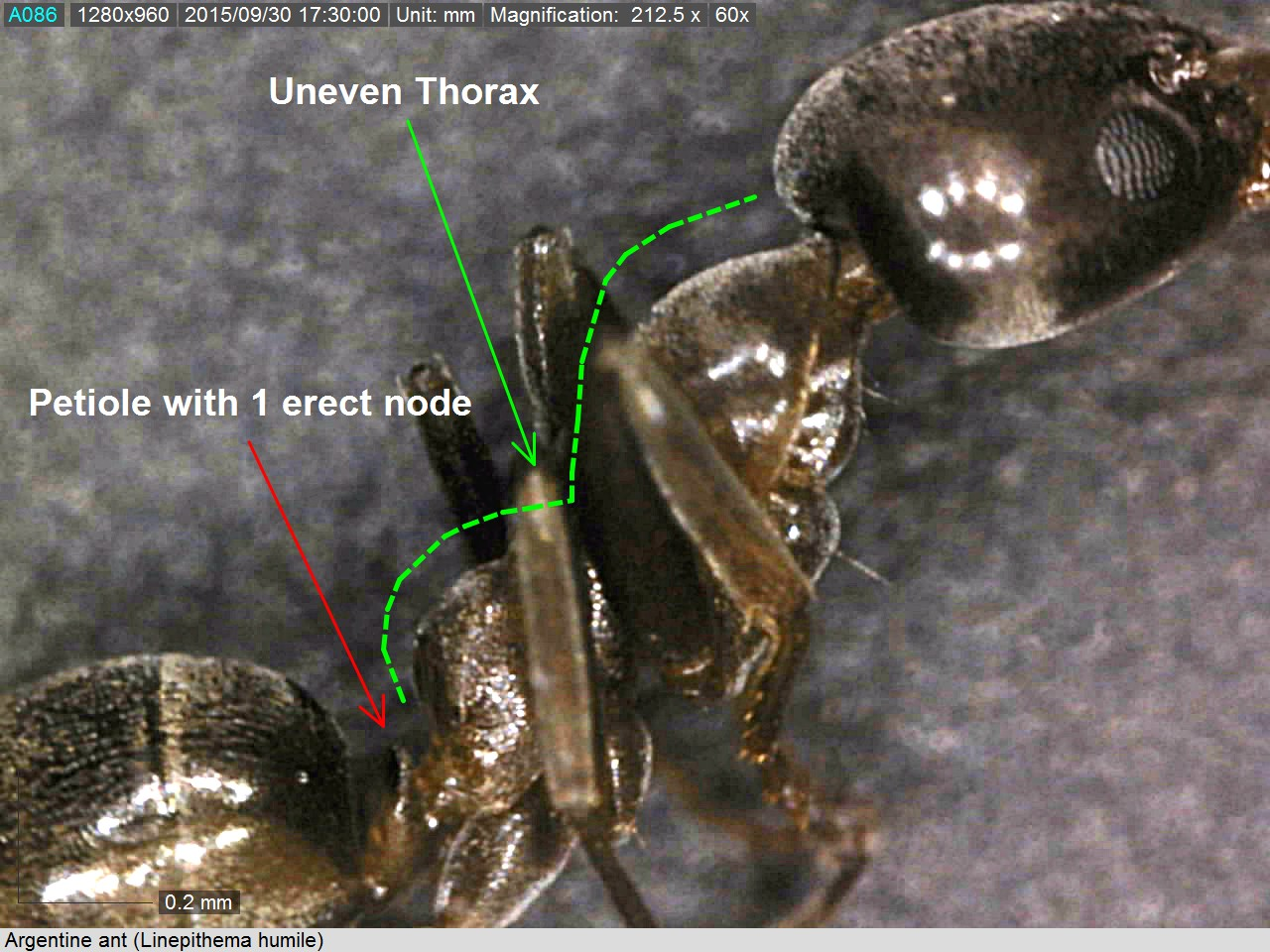
These markers can help identify Argentine ants.

== Distribution ==
The native range of Argentine ants is limited to riparian habitats in the lowland areas of the Paraná River drainage, which stretches across northern Argentina, Uruguay, Paraguay, and southern Brazil. Within South America, this species has spread into parts of Chile, Colombia, Ecuador, and Peru. Linepithema humile thrives in Mediterranean climates, and over the past century it has spread to across the globe by human-mediated transport. The species has become established to every continent except Antarctica and includes many oceanic islands.

=== Global "mega-colony" ===
The absence of aggression within Argentine ant colonies was first reported in 1913 by Newell & Barber, who noted "…there is no apparent antagonism between separate colonies of its own kind". Later studies showed that these "supercolonies" extend across hundreds or thousands of kilometers in different parts of the introduced range, first reported in California in 2000, then in Europe in 2002, Japan in 2009, and Australia in 2010.

Several subsequent studies used genetic, behavioral, and chemical analyses to show that introduced supercolonies on separate continents actually represent a single global supercolony.

The researchers stated that the "enormous extent of this population is paralleled only by human society", and had probably been spread and maintained by human travel.

== Behavior ==
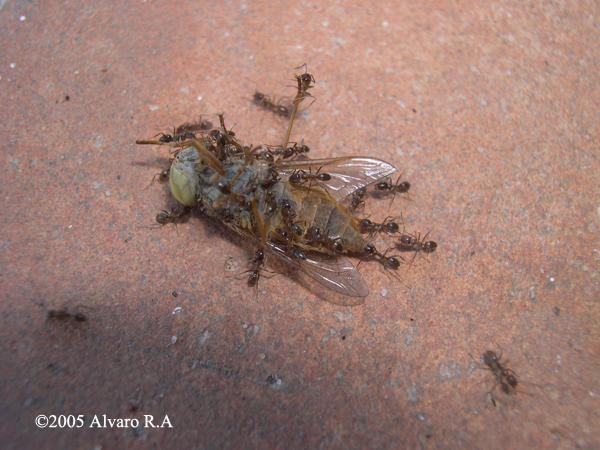
Argentine ants on a dead horse-fly

They have been extraordinarily successful, in part, because different nests of the introduced Argentine ants seldom attack or compete with each other, unlike most other species of ant. In their introduced range, their genetic makeup is so uniform that individuals from one nest can mingle in a neighboring nest without being attacked. Thus, in most of their introduced range, they form supercolonies. The Very Large Colony, which covers territory from San Diego to beyond San Francisco, may have a population of one trillion individuals as of 2010.

Conflict does occur between members of different supercolonies. In 1997, UC San Diego researchers observed fighting between different Argentine ants kept in lab, and in 2004 scientists began to map out the boundaries of the different supercolonies that clashed in San Diego. On the border of the Very Large Colony and the Lake Hodges Colony thirty million ants die each year, on a battlefront that covers many miles. While the battles of other ant species generally constitute colony raids lasting a few hours, or skirmishes that occur periodically for a few weeks, Argentine ants clash ceaselessly; the borders of their territory are a site of constant violence and battles can be fought on top of hundreds of dead ants. Fights may be halted by adverse weather such as rain.

In contrast, native populations are genetically more diverse and form colonies that are much smaller than the supercolonies that dominate the introduced range. Colonies living in close proximity are territorial and aggressive toward one another. Argentine ants in their native South America also co-exist with many other species of ants, and do not attain the high population densities that characterize introduced populations.

In a series of experiments, ants of the same colony were isolated and fed different diets. The hydrocarbons from the diet were eventually incorporated into the cuticle of the subjects. Those that had the same diet appeared to recognize one another as kin. Those who had at least some overlap in dietary composition also appeared to react non-aggressively to one another. These interactions contrasts drastically with the groups that fed on completely different sources, such as those who lived off flies and those that fed on grasshoppers. The groups appeared to have incorporated hydrocarbons that were not similar to the others and created an unfamiliar identity cue. These groups reacted violently towards each other. This suggests that dietary factors affect the recognition cues for colony members.

== Reproduction and seasonal colony trends ==
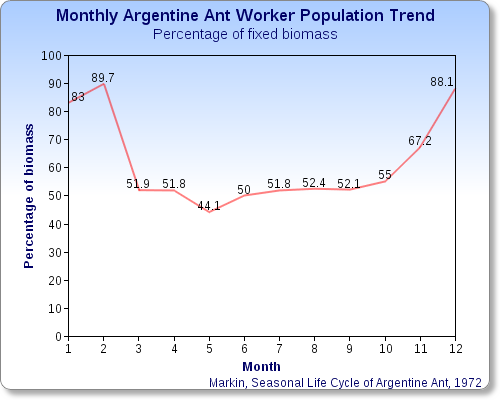
Relative biomass (in %) of workers to colony, calculated from a monthly sampling of 1,000 random colony inhabitants over one year

Like workers in many other ant species, Argentine ant workers are unable to lay reproductive eggs but can direct the development of eggs in reproductive females; the production of males appears to be controlled by the amount of food available to the larvae. Argentine ant colonies almost invariably have many reproductive queens, as many as one queen for every 125 workers.

The seasonal low occurs in mid-winter, when 90% of a representative colony consists of workers and the remainder of queens, and no reproductive activity and minimal birthing. Eggs are produced in late-winter, nearly all of which hatch into sexual forms by May(*). Mating occurs after the females emerge. Worker production increases steadily from mid-March(*) to October(*), after which their numbers are not replenished; thus, their numbers drop steadily over the winter months. ((*) Note that the information regarding the months May, March, and October in this paragraph, as well as the entire Month axis in the graph, are not worldwide correct, in particular in Southern hemisphere, due to the shift of six months in seasons between the two hemispheres.)

Colonies in the Argentine ant's native habitat are kept within a range of ten to one hundred meters by colonies of interspecific and intraspecific rivals. As the colonies expand, they appear to form fluctuating territory borders, which contract and expand on a seasonal and conditional basis. There is an expansive push outward in the summer months, with a retreating motion in the winter. This has to do with soil moisture and temperature conditions. At the edges of these borders are either rival L. humile colonies or other obstacles that prevent further expansion, such as an inhospitable environment for nests.

== Impact ==
The ants are ranked among the world's 100 worst invasive animal species. In its introduced range, the Argentine ant often displaces most or all native ants and can threaten native invertebrates and even small vertebrates that are not accustomed to defending against the aggressive ants. This can, in turn, imperil other species in the ecosystem, such as native plants that depend on native ants for seed dispersal, or lizards that depend on native ants or invertebrates for food. For example, the recent severe decline in coastal horned lizards in southern California is closely tied to Argentine ants displacing native ant species on which the lizards feed. In South Africa, the Argentine ant has in some cases displaced native ants that disperse the seeds of Fynbos plants like Mimetes cucullatus. The Argentine ants don't take the seeds underground and are left on the surface, resulting in ungerminated plants and the dwindling of Fynbos seed reserves after veld fires.

Argentine ants sometimes tend aphid, mealybug, and scale insect colonies, sometimes relocating the parasites to unaffected plants, and their protection of these plant pests from predators and parasitoids can cause problems in agricultural areas. In return for this protection, the ants benefit by feeding off honeydew.

The aggressive behavior of the ants adds pressure to bumble bees Linepithema humile Mayr populations when competing for shared resources. Ant abundance and aggressive biting behaviors lead to more prolonged, disrupted bumblebee foraging and resource collection, and even though bees have the ability to fight back, it is energy lost that could be put towards pollination.

There is also evidence that the presence of Argentine ant may decrease the number of pollinators that visit natural flowering plants via predation on the larvae of the pollinators.

== Pest control ==
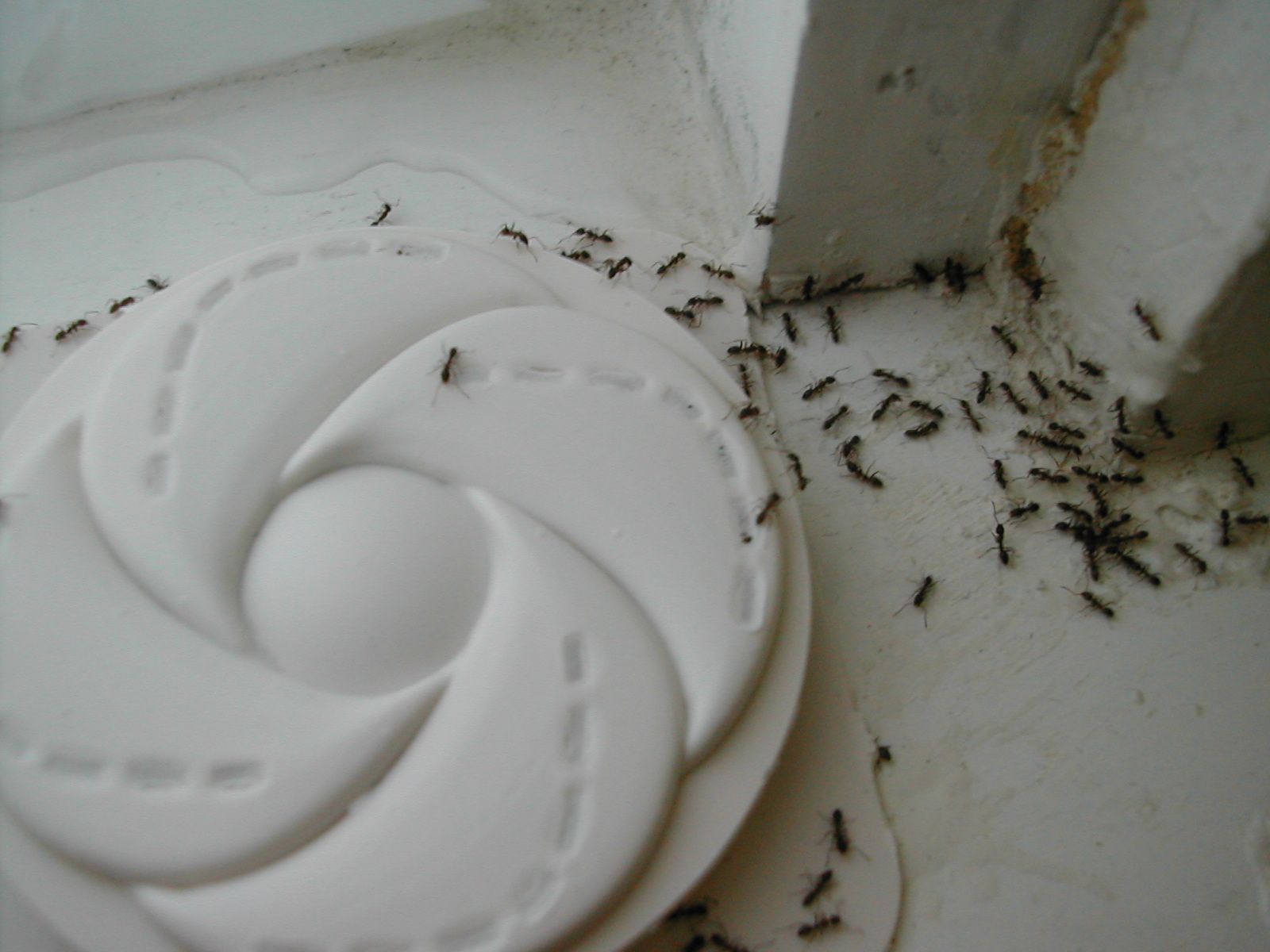
Argentine ants accessing a commercial bait station commonly available in the United States

Argentine ants are a common household pest, often entering structures in search of food or water (particularly during dry or hot weather), or to escape flooded nests during periods of heavy rainfall. When they invade a kitchen, it is not uncommon to see two or three queens foraging along with the workers.

Borate-sucrose water baits are toxic to Argentine ants, when the bait is 25% water, with 0.5–1.0% boric acid or borate salts.

In spring, during a colony's growth phase, protein based baits may be more effective due to much higher demand from the egg-laying queens.

Due to their nesting behavior and presence of numerous queens in each colony, it is generally impractical to spray Argentine ants with pesticides or to use boiling water as with mound building ants. Spraying with pesticides has occasionally stimulated increased egg-laying by the queens, compounding the problem. Pest control usually requires exploiting their omnivorous dietary habits, through use of slow-acting poison bait (e.g. fipronil, hydramethylnon, sulfluramid), which will be carried back to the nest by the workers, eventually killing all the individuals, including the queens.

== Research ==
Researchers from the University of California, Irvine, have developed a way to use the scent of Argentine ants against them. The exoskeletons of the ants are covered with a hydrocarbon-laced secretion. They made a compound that is different, but similar, to the one that coats the ants. If the chemical is applied to an ant, the other members of the colony will kill it.

Another approach for a large scale control of the Argentine ant has been proposed by researchers from Japan, who showed that it is possible to disrupt its trails with synthetic pheromones. This has been confirmed in various later trials by a New Zealand-led team in Hawaii and by researchers from Victoria University of Wellington who showed that this approach is beneficial for other local ant species.

A multi-agency study at the environmentally-sensitive California Channel Islands in the mid-2010s eliminated the Argentine ant to sub-detectable levels. The ant was introduced to the islands in the early- to mid-1900s. Due to strict biosecurity measures, the risk of re-invasion was low and allowed for a controlled study. Four (4) km^{2}, 2% of the island area, was treated with liquid bait pellets similar to off-the-shelf products, dispersed by helicopter. Cost of treatment ranged from $50,000-$200,000 USD (2015) per km^{2} including the cost of subsequent monitoring, and may serve as an initial guideline for other areas.

== See also ==
- Linepithema humile virus 1, a virus carried by Argentine ants
