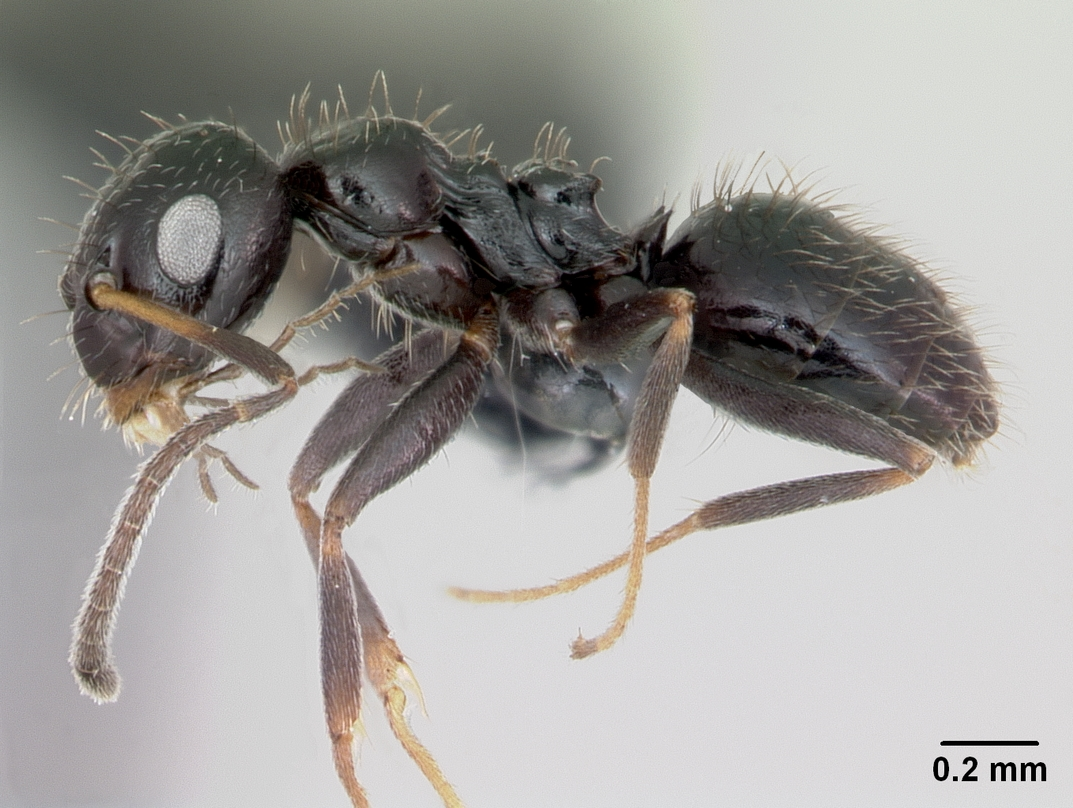
- Lepisiota canescens worker from Madagascar

Scientific classification
- Kingdom: Animalia
- Phylum: Arthropoda
- Class: Insecta
- Order: Hymenoptera
- Family: Formicidae
- Subfamily: Formicinae
- Genus: Lepisiota
- Species: L. canescens

Binomial name
- Lepisiota canescens (Emery, 1897)

= Lepisiota canescens =

Species of ant

Lepisiota canescens is a species of ant in the subfamily Formicinae which is native to southern Ethiopia. Supercolonies spanning as much as 38 kilometres have been found. Scientists believe that this ant species has the potential of spreading all over the world and posing threats to other ants.

== Colonies and adaptability ==
The supercolonies were first discovered by a team of myrmecologists from the North Carolina Museum of Natural Sciences. D. Magdalena Sorger, a member of the team, has stated that the discovery of these species is significant for two (and now various) reasons. First, cases of finding super colonies are extremely rare, with only around 20 worldwide species having the ability to do so. And second, other species in the genus Lepisiota have recently made worrisome headlines all around the world. What is even more frightening about this fact, is that L. canescens is now far more invasive and destructive than its southern and western African counterparts L. capensis and L. angolensis. The species can now be found in 25 different countries apart from Ethiopia. L. canescens has even been able to grab a ride on a cargo ship, and are now found evenly invasively distributed throughout Madagascar.

== Impact ==
The species has mainly been spread by humans. In its introduced range, L. canescens will most probably displace at least one other ant species native to the region. In Ethiopia alone, several species of Pheidole have been adversely affected by the invasive appearances of L. canescens.
