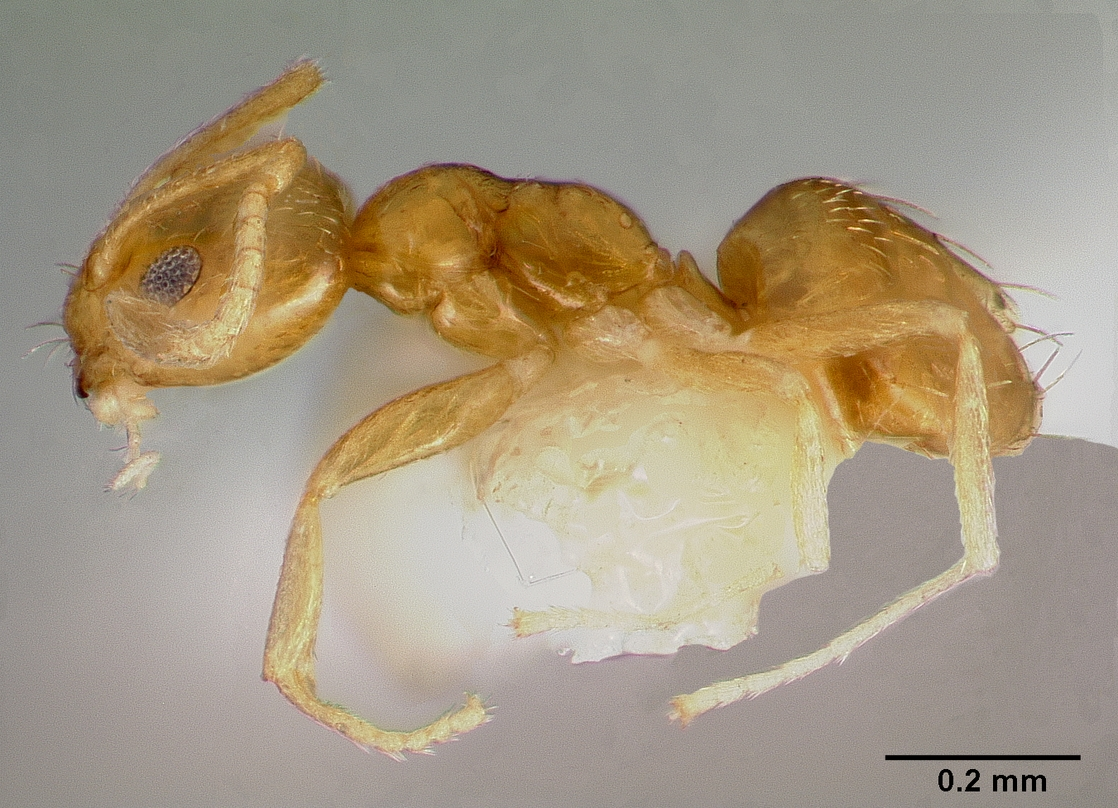
- Plagiolepis alluaudi worker from Fiji

Scientific classification
- Domain: Eukaryota
- Kingdom: Animalia
- Phylum: Arthropoda
- Class: Insecta
- Order: Hymenoptera
- Family: Formicidae
- Subfamily: Formicinae
- Tribe: Plagiolepidini
- Genus: Plagiolepis; Mayr, 1861

Type species
- Formica pygmaea

Diversity
- 72 species

= Plagiolepis =

Genus of ants

Plagiolepis is a genus of ants in the formic acid-producing subfamily Formicinae. The genus is found in tropical and temperate regions of the Old World.

== Species ==
- Plagiolepis abyssinica Forel, 1894
- Plagiolepis adynata Bolton, 1995
- Plagiolepis alluaudi Emery, 1894
- Plagiolepis ampeloni (Faber, 1969)
- Plagiolepis ancyrensis Santschi, 1920
- Plagiolepis arnoldii Dlussky, Soyunov & Zabelin, 1990
- Plagiolepis augusti Emery, 1921
- Plagiolepis balestrierii Menozzi, 1939
- †Plagiolepis balticus Dlussky, 1997
- Plagiolepis bicolor Forel, 1901
- Plagiolepis boltoni Sharaf, Aldawood & Taylor, 2011
- Plagiolepis breviscapa Collingwood & Van Harten, 2005
- Plagiolepis brunni Mayr, 1895
- Plagiolepis calva Radchenko, 1996
- Plagiolepis capensis Mayr, 1865
- Plagiolepis cardiocarenis Chang & He, 2002
- Plagiolepis chirindensis Arnold, 1949
- Plagiolepis clarki Wheeler, 1934
- Plagiolepis compressa Radchenko, 1996
- Plagiolepis decora Santschi, 1914
- Plagiolepis demangei Santschi, 1920
- Plagiolepis deweti Forel, 1904
- Plagiolepis dichroa Forel, 1902
- Plagiolepis dlusskyi Radchenko, 1996
- Plagiolepis exigua Forel, 1894
- Plagiolepis flavescens Collingwood, 1976
- Plagiolepis funicularis Santschi, 1919
- Plagiolepis fuscula Emery, 1895
- Plagiolepis grassei Le Masne, 1956
- Plagiolepis hoggarensis Bernard, 1981
- Plagiolepis intermedia Emery, 1895
- Plagiolepis jerdonii Forel, 1894
- Plagiolepis jouberti Forel, 1910
- Plagiolepis juddi Sharaf, Aldawood & Taylor, 2011
- Plagiolepis karawajewi Radchenko, 1989
- †Plagiolepis klinsmanni Mayr, 1868
- †Plagiolepis kuenowi Mayr, 1868
- †Plagiolepis labilis Emery, 1891
- Plagiolepis livingstonei Santschi, 1926
- Plagiolepis longwang Terayama, 2009
- Plagiolepis lucidula Wheeler, 1934
- Plagiolepis madecassa Forel, 1892
- Plagiolepis mediorufa Forel, 1916
- †Plagiolepis minutissima Dlussky & Perkovsky, 2002
- Plagiolepis moelleri Bingham, 1903
- Plagiolepis montivaga Arnold, 1958
- Plagiolepis nitida Karavaiev, 1935
- Plagiolepis nynganensis McAreavey, 1949
- Plagiolepis pallescens Forel, 1889
- †Plagiolepis paradoxa Dlussky, 2010
- Plagiolepis pictipes Santschi, 1914
- Plagiolepis pissina Roger, 1863
- Plagiolepis pontii Menozzi, 1939
- Plagiolepis puncta Forel, 1910
- Plagiolepis pygmaea (Latreille, 1798)
- Plagiolepis regis Karavaiev, 1931
- Plagiolepis rogeri Forel, 1894
- Plagiolepis schmitzii Forel, 1895
- Plagiolepis simoni Emery, 1921
- †Plagiolepis singularis Mayr, 1868
- †Plagiolepis solitaria Mayr, 1868
- †Plagiolepis squamifera Mayr, 1868
- Plagiolepis squamulosa Wheeler, 1934
- †Plagiolepis succini André, 1895
- Plagiolepis sudanica Weber, 1943
- Plagiolepis taurica Santschi, 1920
- Plagiolepis vanderkelleni Forel, 1901
- Plagiolepis vindobonensis Lomnicki, 1925
- Plagiolepis vladileni Radchenko, 1996
- †Plagiolepis wheeleri Dlussky, 2010
- Plagiolepis wilsoni (Clark, 1934)
- Plagiolepis xene Stärcke, 1936
