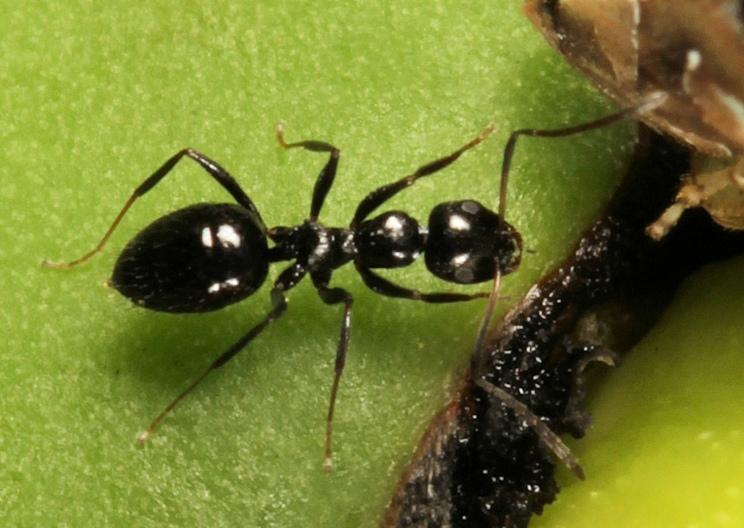
- Lepisiota incisa worker in South Africa
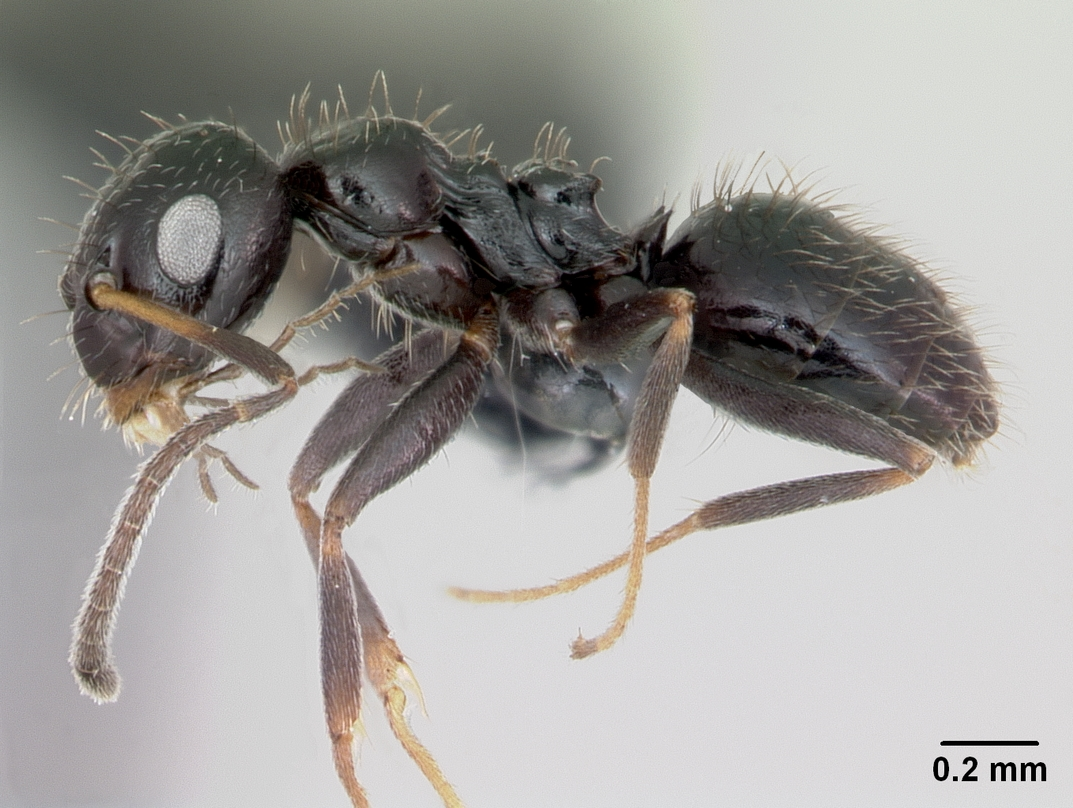
- Lepisiota canescens worker from Madagascar

Scientific classification
- Kingdom: Animalia
- Phylum: Arthropoda
- Class: Insecta
- Order: Hymenoptera
- Family: Formicidae
- Subfamily: Formicinae
- Tribe: Plagiolepidini
- Genus: Lepisiota; Santschi, 1926

Type species
- Plagiolepis rothney

Diversity
- 81 species

Synonyms
- Acantholepis Mayr, 1861

= Lepisiota =

Genus of ants

Lepisiota is an Old World genus of ants in the subfamily Formicinae. They nest in rotten wood, in standing trees or in the ground, generally in less forested areas.

== Species ==
- Lepisiota acuta Xu, 1994
- Lepisiota affinis (Santschi, 1937)
- Lepisiota ajjer (Bernard, 1953)
- Lepisiota albata (Santschi, 1935)
- Lepisiota alexis (Santschi, 1937)
- Lepisiota ambigua (Santschi, 1935)
- Lepisiota angolensis (Santschi, 1937)
- Lepisiota annandalei (Mukerjee, 1930)
- Lepisiota arabica (Collingwood, 1985)
- Lepisiota arenaria (Arnold, 1920)
- Lepisiota arnoldi (Forel, 1913)
- Lepisiota aurea (Karavaiev, 1933)
- Lepisiota bipartita (Smith, 1861)
- Lepisiota cacozela (Stitz, 1916)
- Lepisiota canescens (Emery, 1897)
- Lepisiota capensis (Mayr, 1862)
- Lepisiota capitata (Forel, 1913)
- Lepisiota carbonaria (Emery, 1892)
- Lepisiota chapmani (Wheeler, 1935)
- Lepisiota crinita (Mayr, 1895)
- Lepisiota curta (Emery, 1897)
- Lepisiota dammama Collingwood & Agosti, 1996
- Lepisiota dendrophila (Arnold, 1949)
- Lepisiota depilis (Emery, 1897)
- Lepisiota deplanata (Stitz, 1911)
- Lepisiota depressa (Santschi, 1914)
- Lepisiota dhofara Collingwood & Agosti, 1996
- Lepisiota dolabellae (Forel, 1911)
- Lepisiota egregia (Forel, 1913)
- Lepisiota elegantissima Collingwood & Van Harten, 2011
- Lepisiota emmelii (Kutter, 1932)
- Lepisiota erythraea (Forel, 1910)
- Lepisiota fergusoni (Forel, 1895)
- Lepisiota foreli (Arnold, 1920)
- Lepisiota frauenfeldi (Mayr, 1855) ("browsing ant" - a pest in Australia)
- Lepisiota gerardi (Santschi, 1915)
- Lepisiota gracilicornis (Forel, 1892)
- Lepisiota harteni Collingwood & Agosti, 1996
- Lepisiota hexiangu Terayama, 2009
- Lepisiota hirsuta (Santschi, 1914)
- Lepisiota imperfecta (Santschi, 1926)
- Lepisiota incisa (Forel, 1913)
- Lepisiota kabulica (Pisarski, 1967)
- Lepisiota karawaiewi (Kuznetsov-Ugamsky, 1929)
- Lepisiota longinoda (Arnold, 1920)
- Lepisiota megacephala (Weber, 1943)
- Lepisiota melanogaster (Emery, 1915)
- Lepisiota melas (Emery, 1915)
- Lepisiota mlanjiensis (Arnold, 1946)
- Lepisiota modesta (Forel, 1894)
- Lepisiota monardi (Santschi, 1930)
- Lepisiota nigrescens (Karavaiev, 1912)
- Lepisiota nigrisetosa (Santschi, 1935)
- Lepisiota nigriventris (Emery, 1899)
- Lepisiota obtusa (Emery, 1901)
- Lepisiota oculata (Santschi, 1935)
- Lepisiota opaca (Forel, 1892)
- Lepisiota opaciventris (Finzi, 1936)
- Lepisiota palpalis (Santschi, 1935)
- Lepisiota piliscapa (Santschi, 1935)
- Lepisiota quadraticeps (Arnold, 1944)
- Lepisiota reticulata Xu, 1994
- Lepisiota riyadha Collingwood & Agosti, 1996
- Lepisiota rothneyi (Forel, 1894)
- Lepisiota rubrovaria (Forel, 1910)
- Lepisiota rugithorax (Santschi, 1930)
- Lepisiota schoutedeni (Santschi, 1935)
- Lepisiota semenovi (Ruzsky, 1905)
- Lepisiota sericea (Forel, 1892)
- Lepisiota silvicola (Arnold, 1920)
- Lepisiota somalica (Menozzi, 1927)
- Lepisiota spinisquama (Kuznetsov-Ugamsky, 1929)
- Lepisiota spinosior (Forel, 1913)
- Lepisiota splendens (Karavaiev, 1912)
- Lepisiota submetallica (Arnold, 1920)
- Lepisiota syriaca (André, 1881)
- Lepisiota tenuipilis (Santschi, 1935)
- Lepisiota validiuscula (Emery, 1897)
- Lepisiota vynia Fisher, 2025
- Lepisiota xichangensis (Wu & Wang, 1995)
