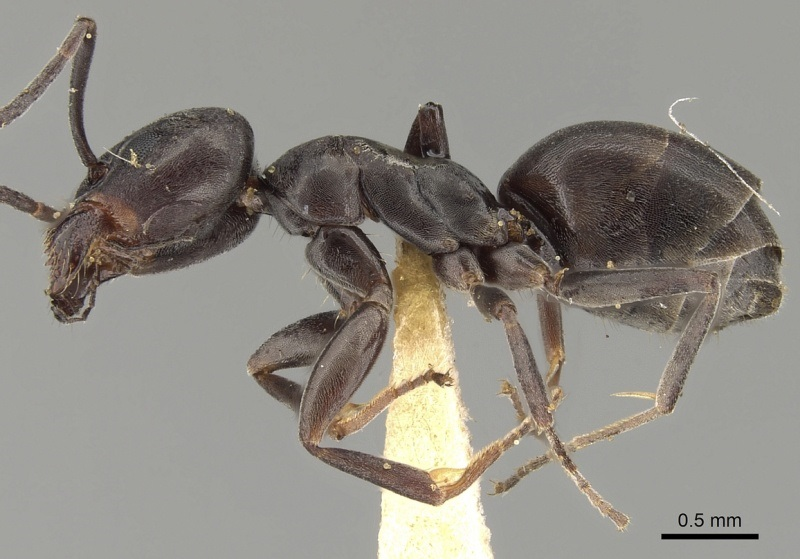

Scientific classification
- Domain: Eukaryota
- Kingdom: Animalia
- Phylum: Arthropoda
- Class: Insecta
- Order: Hymenoptera
- Family: Formicidae
- Subfamily: Dolichoderinae
- Genus: Tapinoma
- Species: T. nigerrimum

Binomial name
- Tapinoma nigerrimum Nylander, 1856

Synonyms
- Tapinoma magnum Mayr, 1861; Tapinoma nigerrima ibericum Santschi, 1925

= Tapinoma nigerrimum =

Species of ant

Tapinoma nigerrimum is a species of ant in the genus Tapinoma. Described by Nylander in 1856, the species is endemic to Africa and Europe.

Tapinoma magnum (Mayr, 1861) belongs to the species complex of Tapinoma nigerrimum(Nylander, 1856).
