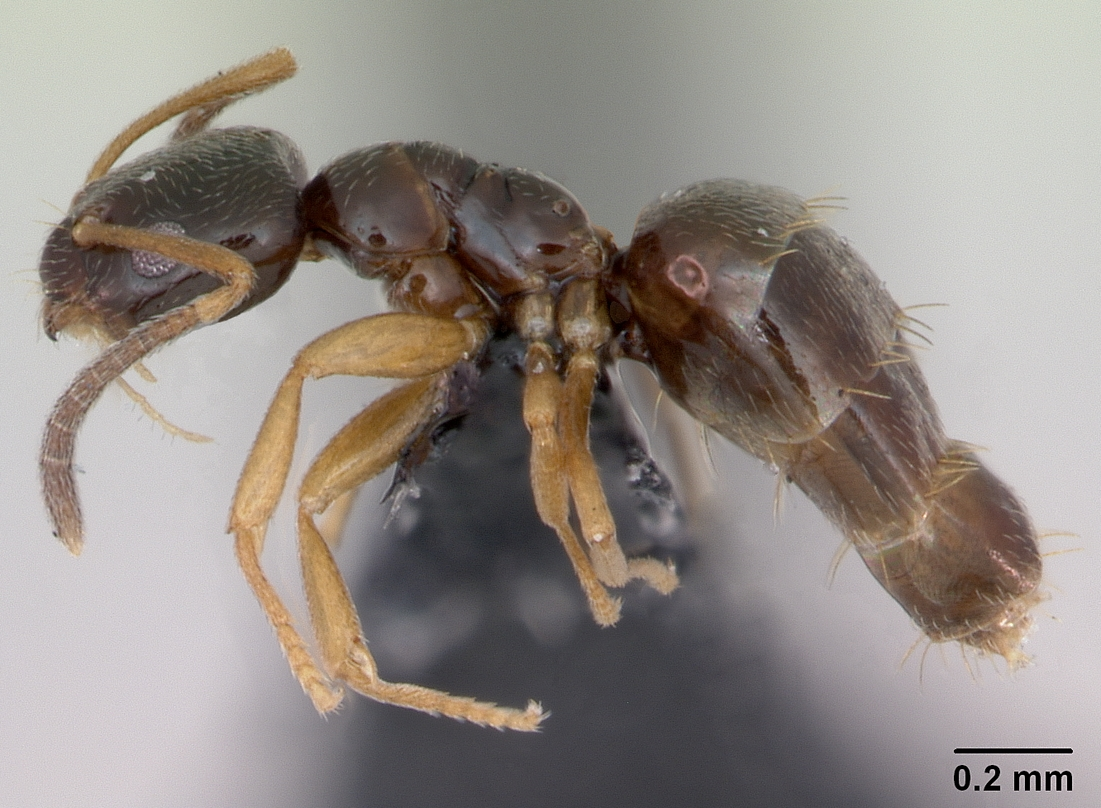

Scientific classification
- Kingdom: Animalia
- Phylum: Arthropoda
- Class: Insecta
- Order: Hymenoptera
- Family: Formicidae
- Subfamily: Formicinae
- Genus: Plagiolepis
- Species: P. pygmaea

Binomial name
- Plagiolepis pygmaea (Latreille, 1798)

= Plagiolepis pygmaea =

Species of ant

Plagiolepis pygmaea is a species of ant in the genus Plagiolepis. The species is widely distributed, from Portugal and the Canary Islands in the west, eastwards to Iran, Germany in the north and the Arabian Peninsula in the south.

== Subspecies ==
- Plagiolepis pygmaea bulawayensis Arnold, 1922
- Plagiolepis pygmaea mima Arnold, 1922
- Plagiolepis pygmaea minu Forel, 1911
