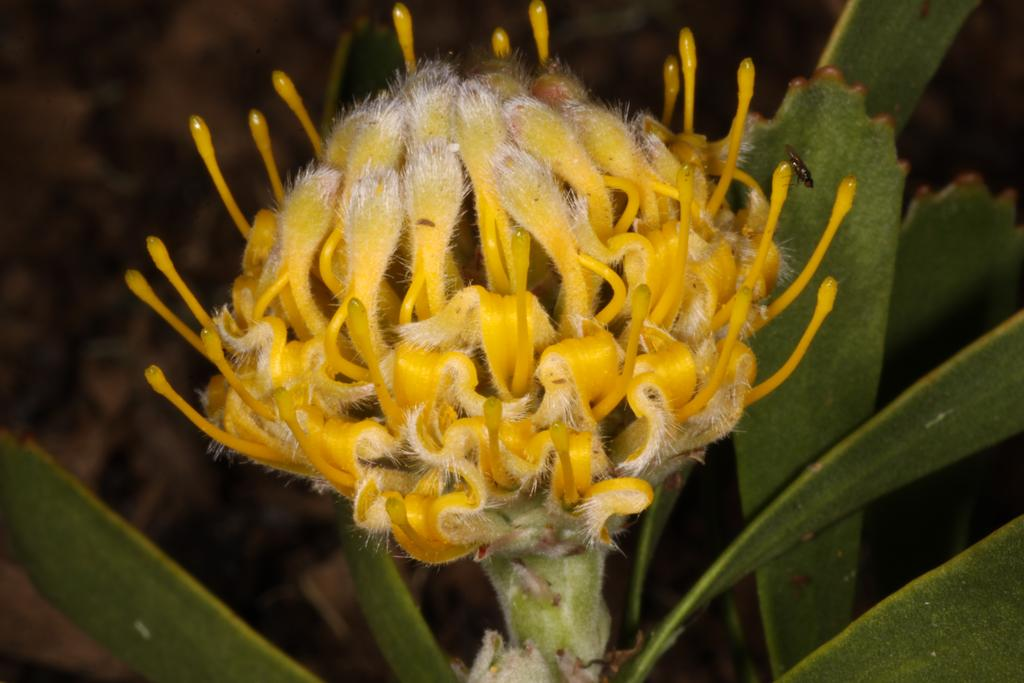

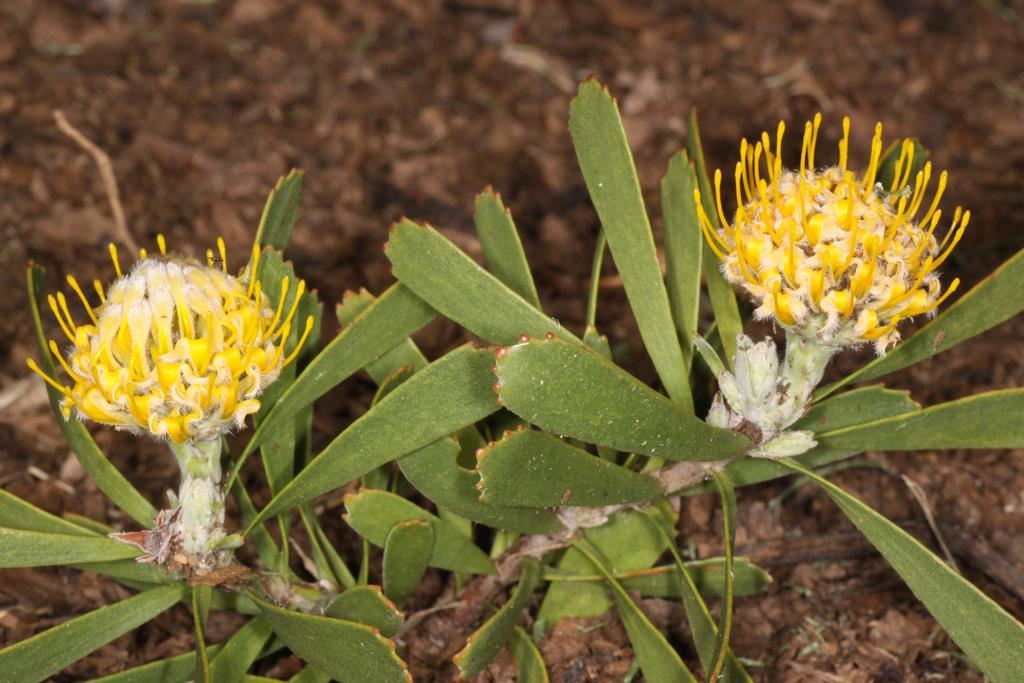

Conservation status
- Vulnerable (IUCN 3.1)

Scientific classification
- Kingdom: Plantae
- Clade: Embryophytes
- Clade: Tracheophytes
- Clade: Angiosperms
- Clade: Eudicots
- Order: Proteales
- Family: Proteaceae
- Genus: Leucospermum
- Species: L. muirii

Binomial name
- Leucospermum muirii Phillips

= Leucospermum muirii =

Species of plant native to South Africa

Leucospermum muirii is a rounded, upright, evergreen shrub of about 1 1/2 m (4.9 ft) high, with a single trunk at its base, that is assigned to the Proteaceae. The flowering branches are 2–3 mm (0.079–0.118 in) thick and are initially grey due to a covering of fine crinkly hairs, which are soon lost. The very narrow spade-shaped leaves of about 5 cm (2.0 in) long and 3/4 cm (0.30 in) wide carry three to seven teeth, and also quickly lose their soft layer of hairs. Its smallish globe-shaped flower heads of 2–3 cm (0.79–1.18 in) in diameter occur with one to four together, each on a stalk of 1–2 cm (0.39–0.79 in) long. It has pale to greenish yellow flowers, becoming orange with age, with some long hairs near their tips, from which straight styles stick out. This gives the flower head the likeness of a pincushion. It flowers from July till October and is pollinated by birds. It is called Albertinia pincushion in English and bloukoolhout in Afrikaans. It is an endemic species that can only be found near Albertinia in the very south of the Western Cape province of South Africa.

== Description ==
Leucospermum muirii is an evergreen, rounded, upright shrub of about 1 1/2 m (4.9 ft) high, branching from a central trunk. The flowering branches are slim, 2–3 mm (0.079–0.118 in) thick, which are initially covered with soft grey crinkly hairs, which are lost over time. The leaves an almost linear to very narrowly spade-shaped, 4–6 cm (1.6–2.4 in) long and 4–10 mm (0.16–0.39 in) wide with three to seven teeth near its tip, the surface at first with soft crisped hairs which are soon lost however.

The flower heads are set individually or in groups of two to four together, globe-shaped 2–3 cm (0.79–1.18 in) in diameter, each set on an inflorescence stalk of 1–2 cm (0.39–0.79 in) long. The common base of the flowers in the same head is broad conical in shape, approximately 1 cm (0.39 in) long and 8 mm (0.31 in) wide, which is subtended by oval bracts with a pointy tip, 7–8 mm (0.28–0.31 in) long and about 4 mm (0.16 in) wide, tightly overlapping, rubbery in consistency, greyish softly hairy. The bracts that subtend the individual flower are broadly oval with a pointy tip, about 7 mm (0.28 in) long and 5 mm (0.20 in) wide, rubbery in consistency, with dense woolly hairs at their base and rubbery in consistency. The 4-merous perianth is 1 1/4–1 1/2 cm (0.49–0.59 in) long, pale to greenish yellow in colour. The lowest, fully merged, part of the perianth, called tube, is about ½ cm (0.2 in) long, cylindric in shape or slightly laterally compressed, hairless at base and minutely powdery where it merges into the middle part (or claws) where the perianth is split lengthwise, which is also powdery or have very short hairs. The upper part (or limbs), which enclosed the pollen presenter in the bud consists of four narrowly lanceolate lobes of about 2 mm (0.079 in) long, with the outer surface of the limbs facing sideways and to the center of the flower head have a tuft of long hairs, the lobe facing the rim of the flower head hardly so. From the perianth emerges a straight style, 1 1/4–2 1/4 cm (0.49–0.89 in) long, topped by a very slight thickening called pollen presenter. That is cylinder-shaped, about 1 mm (0.039 in) long, with the very end split in two. The ovary is subtended by four pale yellow, awl-shaped nectar producing scales of about 1 mm (0.039 in) long.

The subtribe Proteinae, to which the genus Leucospermum has been assigned, consistently has a basic chromosome number of twelve (2n=24).

=== Differences with related species ===
L. muirii looks like L. truncatum, which has more soft hair on its broader leaves.

== Taxonomy ==
As far as we know, the Albertinia pincushion was first collected for science by the South African naturalist John Muir in 1909, from a location called Zandhoogte near Albertinia. In 1910, Edwin Percy Phillips described it and named it in honor of its collector Leucospermum muirii. It has been assigned to the section Tumiditubus.

== Distribution, habitat and ecology ==
Leucospermum muirii is an endemic species restricted to the Albertinia plateau a few miles east and west of Albertinia village and from there to the coast in the south between Still Bay and Gouritsmond at altitudes varying between 90 and 250 m (300 and 820 ft). The Albertinia pincushion only grows in flats consisting of deep, white sands, where it may form small dense stands, in the company of several Ericaceae, tall Restionaceae, Leucadendron galpinii, Leucospermum praecox and Protea repens. It is pollinated by birds. The seeds need about two months to ripen and subsequently fall to the ground, to be collected by ants and carried into their underground nests. The plants die when exposed to one of the wildfires that naturally occurs in the fynbos where this plant grows, but the stored seeds will subsequently germinate to continuate the population.

== Conservation ==
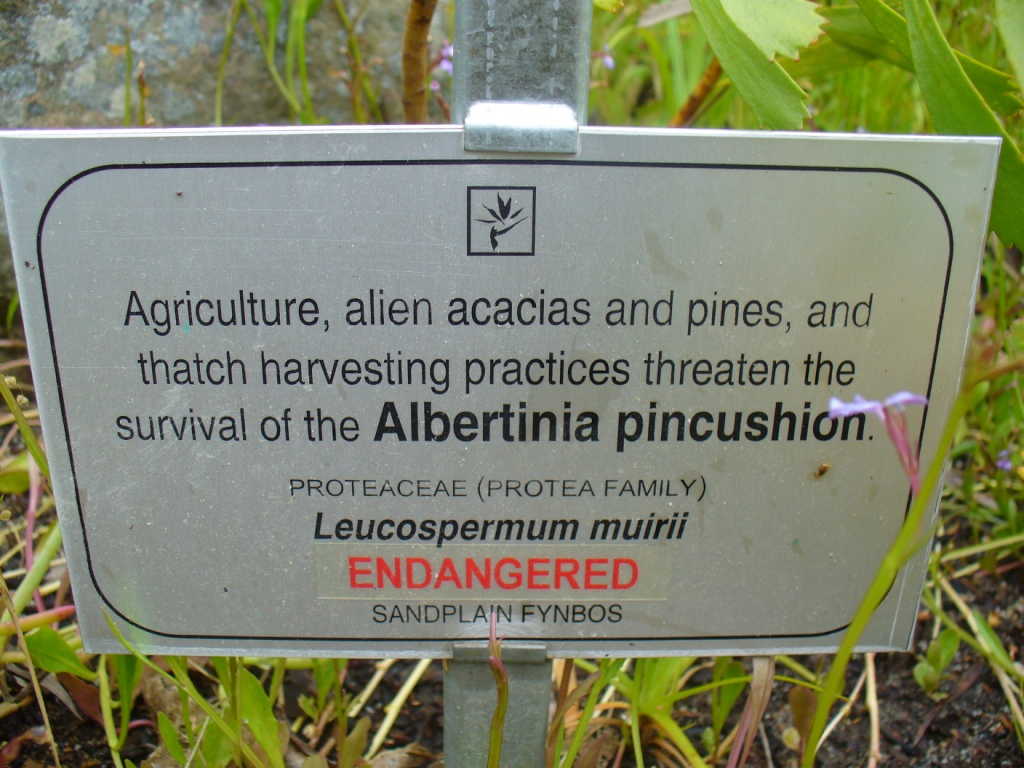
information sign in the Kirstenbosch National Botanical Garden

The Albertinia pincushion is considered endangered as it has a very limited distribution of below 169 km^{2} (65 sq mi) and is under thread by agricultural development, so-called field improvements to increase the yield of tall restionids for thatching, invasive species, urban expansion near Albertinia and climate change. The species can often only be found on roadsides, suggesting it has already disappeared from the surrounding fields.
