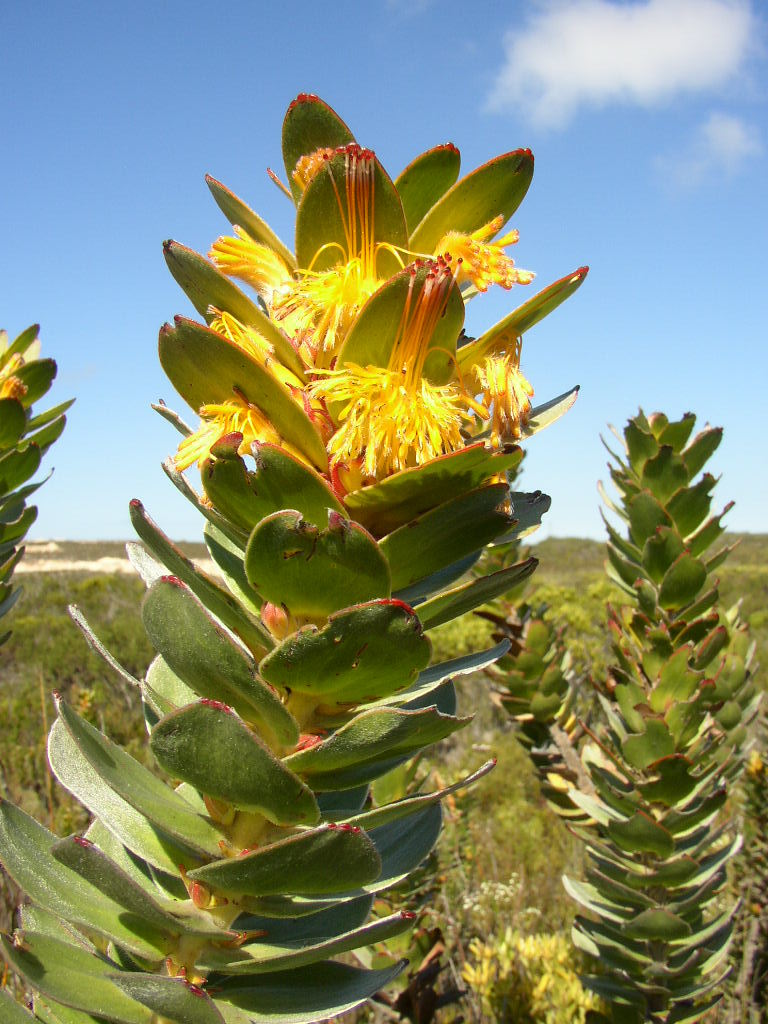

Conservation status
- Endangered (IUCN 3.1)

Scientific classification
- Kingdom: Plantae
- Clade: Tracheophytes
- Clade: Angiosperms
- Clade: Eudicots
- Order: Proteales
- Family: Proteaceae
- Genus: Mimetes
- Species: M. saxatilis

Binomial name
- Mimetes saxatilis E.Phillips

= Mimetes saxatilis =

Species of plant endemic to South Africa

Mimetes saxatilis or limestone pagoda is an evergreen, upright, rarely branching shrub of 1–2¼ m (3⅓–7¼ ft) high, assigned to the family Proteaceae. The approximately oval leaves are 3½–5 cm (1.4–2.0 in) long and 1½–3 cm (0.6–1.2 in) wide with a blunt, thickened, reddish tip or with three crowded teeth. It has cylinder-shaped inflorescences topped by a crest of green leaves, further consisting of heads with 12–22 individual bright yellow flowers, each in the axil of a flat, green leaf. It is an endemic species that is restricted to limestone outcrops in the Agulhas plains in the very south of the Western Cape province of South Africa. It is considered an endangered species. Flowering may occur between July and December, but is unreliable in its timing, dependent on sufficient moisture availability.

== Description ==
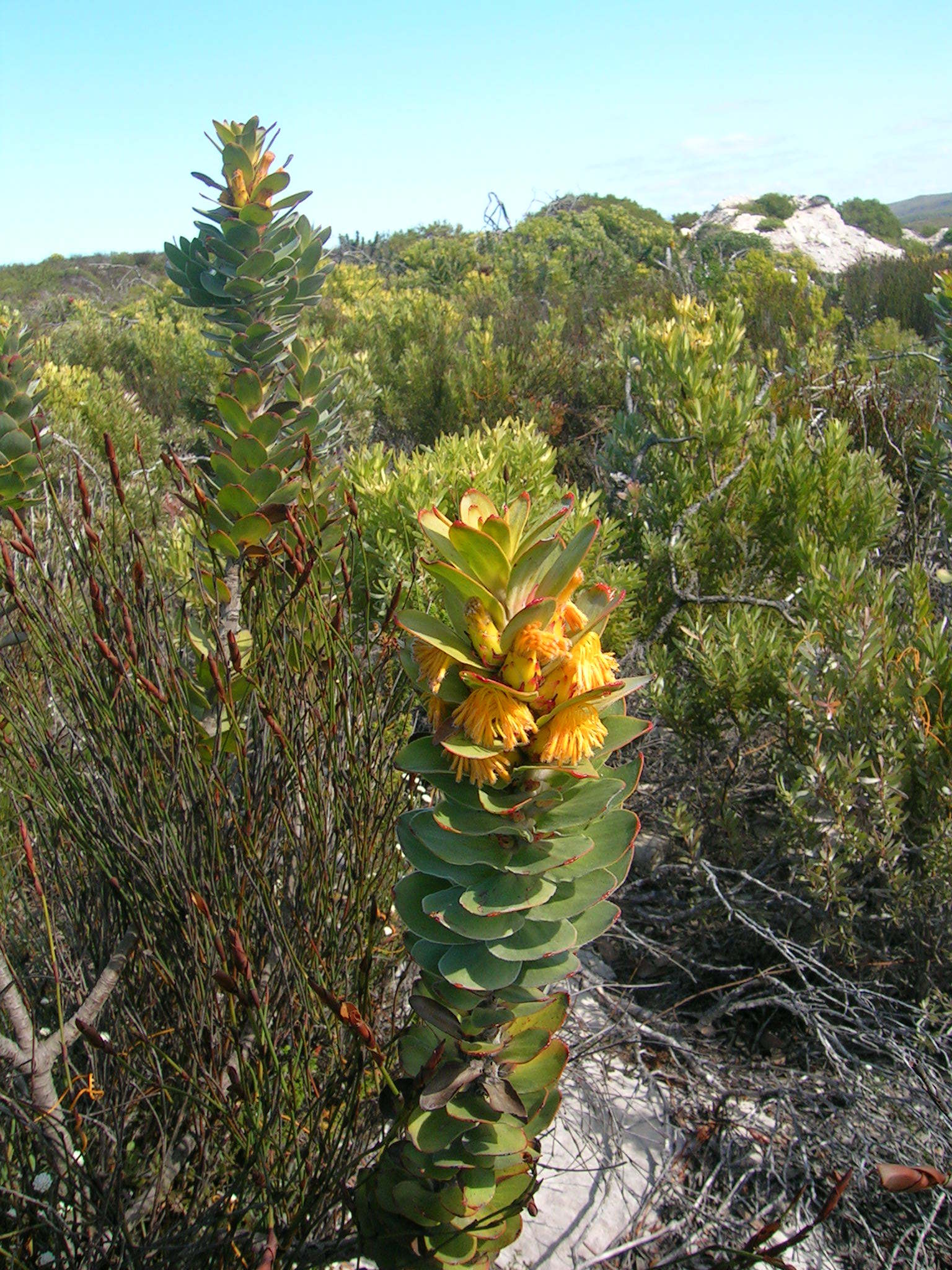
Habit

Mimetes saxatilis is an evergreen, upright, rarely branching shrub of 1–2¼ m (3⅓–7¼ ft) high. Its branches are ½–1 cm (0.2–0.4 in) thick, initially densely felty, later becoming hairless. After the leaves are shed, conspicuous marks remain. The leathery leaves are alternately set, at a slight upward angle and somewhat overlapping and lack both stipules and leaf stalks. The leaves are elliptic to broadly oval, 3½–5 cm (1.4–2.0 in) long and 1½–3 cm (0.6–1.2 in) wide with an entire margin and a blunt thickened tip or with three crowded teeth, with a row of hairs along the rim and an initially felty, later hairless surface.

The inflorescences at the top of the shoots are cylinder-shaped, 5–10 cm (2–4 in) long and 5–6 cm (2.0–2.4 in) in diameter below a crest of green, oval or elliptic, more or less upright leaves. The flower heads consist of fourteen to twenty two individual flowers and are subtended by an ordinary, flat, green leaf. The outer whorl of bracts that encircle the flower heads are loosely arranged, oval to broadly lance-shaped with a pointy tip, 1–2½ cm (0.4–1.0 in) long and 6–8 mm (¼–⅓ in) wide, with a hairless surface except for a row of hairs along the edge. The bracts on the inside of the head are narrowly lance-shaped, 1¼–2½ cm (½–1 in) long and ¼–½ cm (0.1–0.2 in) wide.

The bract that subtend the individual flower is lance-shaped, 1¼–2¼ cm (0.5–0.9 in) long and 1–2 mm (0.04–0.08 in) wide, with very densely silky margins. The yellow 4-merous perianth is 3–3½ cm (1.2–1.4 in) long. The lower part called tube, that remains merged when the flower is open, is about 2 mm (0.08 in) long, slightly inflated, and hairless. The four segments in the middle part (or claws), are thread-shaped and have some felty hairs. The segments in the upper part (or limbs), which enclosed the pollen presenter in the bud, are boat-shaped, line-shaped with a pointy tip in outline, about 5 mm long, with a few scattered hairs. The four anthers are about 2 mm (0.08 in) long, lack a filament and are directly connected to the limbs. From the centre of the perianth emerges a slender style of 3–5 cm (1.2–2.0 in) long, that is pale yellow near the pollen presenter. The thickened part at the tip of the style called pollen presenter has a ring at its base, is squared cylinder-shaped in the middle and pointy egg-shaped at the tip. The approximately 1 mm (0.04 in) long ovary is egg-shaped, finely silky hairy, and is subtended by four pointy, awl- to line-shaped scales of about 2 mm (0.08 in) long. The ovary develops into a cylinder-shaped fruit of 6–8 mm (¼–⅓ in) long and 3–4 mm in diameter.

=== Differences with related species ===
The limestone pagoda can be distinguished from other Mimetes species by the pale yellow colour of the involucral bracts, that are hairless except for a hairy fringe, the large number (12–22) of yellow flowers per head, each with a yellow style. The pollen presenter has a very typical shape, a squared cylinder at its base and pointy egg-shaped at the tip. Only two other Mimetes species are yellow-flowered. The golden pagoda M. chrysanthus, has 25–35 individual flowers per head and its involucral bracts are woolly at base. The flower heads of the small cryptic pagoda M. palustris contain three to six individual flowers, and the leaves in the inflorescence are tightly overlapping, not patent as in both larger species.

== Taxonomy ==
The limestone pagoda was first collected by Rudolf Schlechter in 1896 from the neighborhood of Elim, who called it Mimetes saxatilis without giving a proper description. This was published eventually by Edwin Percy Phillips in 1911. No synonyms are known. The species name saxatilis is a Latin word that means "that lives amongst rocks".

== Distribution and habitat ==
Mimetes saxatilis can be found in an approximately 100 km (63 mi) long, narrow strip along the south coast of about 3 km (2 mi) wide between Franskraal in the west and Struisbay, several km east of Cape Agulhas, and from there in a narrow strip inland to around Bredasdorp. It occurs from sea level to at most 180 m (590 ft). It only grows on limestone of the Alexandria Formation and derived alkaline soils. It seems to do best in sinkholes and crevices where the rock is bare. It grows together with other Proteacea that prefer limestone, including Leucospermum patersonii, Protea obtusifolia and Leucadendron meridianum.

Flowers may open anywhere between July and December, but this seems to depend on the availability of sufficient moisture. Over most of its distribution, the average annual precipitation is about 400 mm (16 in). The fruits are ripe about 9 months after flowering.

== Conservation ==
The limestone pagoda is considered an endangered species due to the very limited areas where its populations occupy 62 km^{2} (24 sq mi) within a distribution area of 215 km^{2} (83 sq mi), the continuing decline of its five known subpopulations as a result of ongoing urban sprawl and competition by invasive plant species. It is also under threat because alien ants like Linepithema humile (Argentine ant), destroy the nests of the indigenous ants, and unlike the native ants eat the elaiosomes where ever the seed has fallen, so that it is not protected against fire and can easily be found and eaten by mice and birds.
