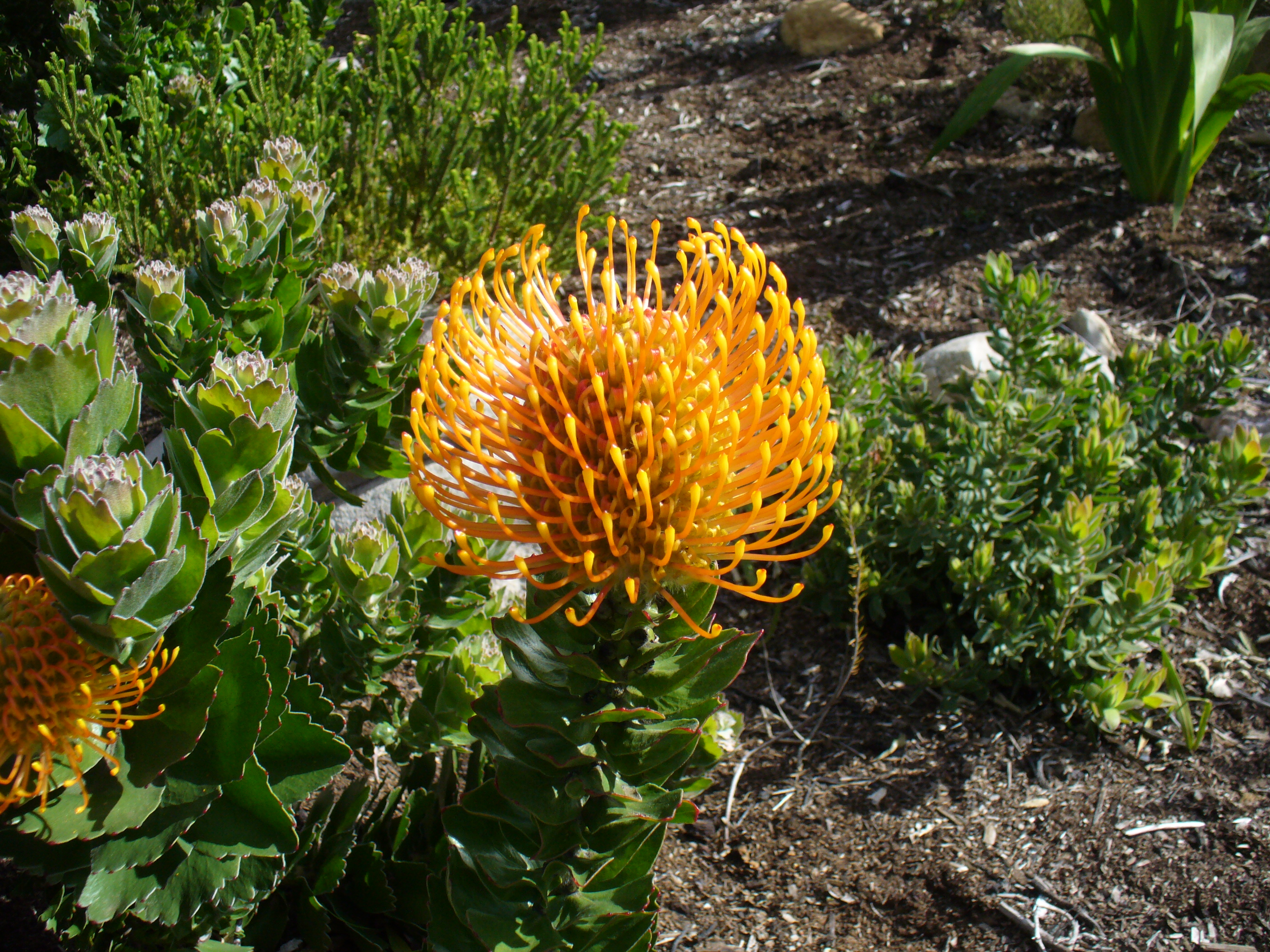

Conservation status
- Near Threatened (IUCN 3.1)

Scientific classification
- Kingdom: Plantae
- Clade: Embryophytes
- Clade: Tracheophytes
- Clade: Angiosperms
- Clade: Eudicots
- Order: Proteales
- Family: Proteaceae
- Genus: Leucospermum
- Species: L. patersonii

Binomial name
- Leucospermum patersonii E.Phillips

= Leucospermum patersonii =

Species of plant native to South Africa

Leucospermum patersonii is a large evergreen, upright shrub of up to 4 m (13 ft) high that is assigned to the family Proteaceae. It has large, roundish hairless leaves with three to eight teeths and egg- to globe-shaped, orange flower heads of 8–9 cm (3.1–3.5 in) across. From the center of each flower emerges a long orange style with a thickened tip that is bent to the center of the head, giving the entire head the appearance of a pincushion. It is called silveredge pincushion in English. Flowers can be found between August and December. It is an endemic species limited to the south coast of the Western Cape province of South Africa.

== Description ==
The silveredge pincushion is a large, rounded shrub or sometimes a small tree of up to 4 m (13 ft) high, that has a stout trunk of 10–20 cm (4–8 in) in diameter covered in a thick corky bark. The flowering stems are upright, woody, 8–10 mm (0.31–0.39 in) in diameter, densely covered in short fine cringy hairs and some straight, spreading hairs. The hairless leaves are almost round to rounded rectangular, 5–9 cm (2.0–3.5 in) long and 3–5 cm (1.2–2.0 in) wide, hart-shaped foot or with ears reaching beyond the stem and a rounded tip with three to eight, deep, bony teeth, are set alternately, directed at an upward angle, overlapping, crowded near the branch tips.

The flower heads are egg- to globe-shaped, about 8–9 cm (3.1–3.5 in) across, usually set individually but occasionally clustered with two or three together, each set on a stalk 1–2 cm (0.39–0.79 in) long. The common base of the flowers in the same head is narrowly cone-shaped with a pointy tip, 4–5 cm (1.6–2.0 in) long and 7–10 mm (0.28–0.39 in) wide. The bracts subtending the flower head are pointy oval in shape, about 10 mm (0.39 in) long an 7 mm (0.28 in) wide, tightly pressed and overlapping, cartilaginous in consistency and finely powdery hairy or hairless.

The bracts at the base of the individual flower is inverted egg-shaped, convex and keeled, with a pointy tip, densely woolly neat the foot, about 10 mm (0.39 in) long and 8 mm (0.31 in) wide. The 4-merous perianth is 2 1/2–3 cm (0.98–1.18 in) long, very strongly curved towards the center of the head in the bud, and orange to crimson in colour. In the lower part, where the lobes remain merged when the flower has opened (called tube), the lobes are tapering, about 5 mm (0.20 in) long, cylinder-shaped and hairless. The lobes in the middle part (or claws), where the perianth is split lengthwise, curve back on their base when the flower opens, and is densely woolly hairy. The upper part, which enclosed the pollen presenter in the bud consists of four strongly recurved, oval limbs of about 4 mm (0.16 in) long, hairless of with some stiff, bristly hairs. From the perianth emerges a style of 4 1/2–5 cm (1.8–2.0 in) long, strongly bent towards the center of the head. The so-called pollen presenter, onto which the pollen is transferred from the anthers in the bud, is shaped like a skewed spinning top, 3–4 mm (0.12–0.16 in) long and about 2 mm (0.079 in) in diameter, with an oblique groove that performs the function of the stigma across the very tip. The ovary is subtended by four awl-shaped pale orange scales of about 4 mm (0.16 in) long.

=== Differences with related species ===
The silveredge pincushion differs from its relatives by the tree-like habit (shared with L. conocarpodendron), large, roundish leaves with three to eight teeths, the middle part of the flower woolly hairy, and the skewed, spinning-top shaped pollen presenter.

== Taxonomy ==
The silveredge pincushion had been collected by some of the earliest plant collectors, among which excellent specimens collected by Oldenland, who was master gardener in service of the Dutch East India Company at the Cape up until the year 1697. Johannes Burman and J.C.D. von Schreber had these specimens in their herbarium collections, but filed them as L. conocarpodendron, and their distinctiveness was overlooked for over two hundred years. After it was collected again in 1922 by a Mr. H.W. Paterson who, lived in Hermanus, it was scientifically described for the first time by Phillips in 1928. He named it Leucospermum patersonii, in the collector's honor. No other scientific names for this species exist.

L. patersonii has been assigned to the showy pincushions, section Brevifilamentum.

== Distribution, habitat and ecology ==
L. patersonii can be found between Cape Agulhas in the east along the coast to Stanford, with an outlying population at Heuningklip Kloof, near Kleinmond. It also used to occur near Hermanus but went extinct there. The silveredge pincushion is a species of the coast that is almost restricted to limestone ridges next to the sea between 50 and 250 m (160 and 820 ft) altitudes. Except for the population at Heuningklip Kloof, the species grows on limestone of the Alexandria Formation. In roots mostly penetrating the system soft layers of limestone closer to the surface. The silveredge pincushion usually grows in fairly dense stands in a vegetation that also contains other Proteaceae with a preference for limestone, including Mimetes saxatilis, Protea obtusifolia and Leucadendron meridianum. Mature plants are able to regenerate from the tips of the branches, if the wildfires that periodically occur in the fynbos are not too hot.

== Cultivation ==
The upright habit and large conspicuous flower heads make L. patersonii attractive as a cut flower and ornamental species. Because it is adapted to lime, it is used to make hybrids that can grow on a range of soil types. Several such hybrids have been developed by crossing L. patersonii with L. conocarpodendron, which is itself intolerant of lime.
