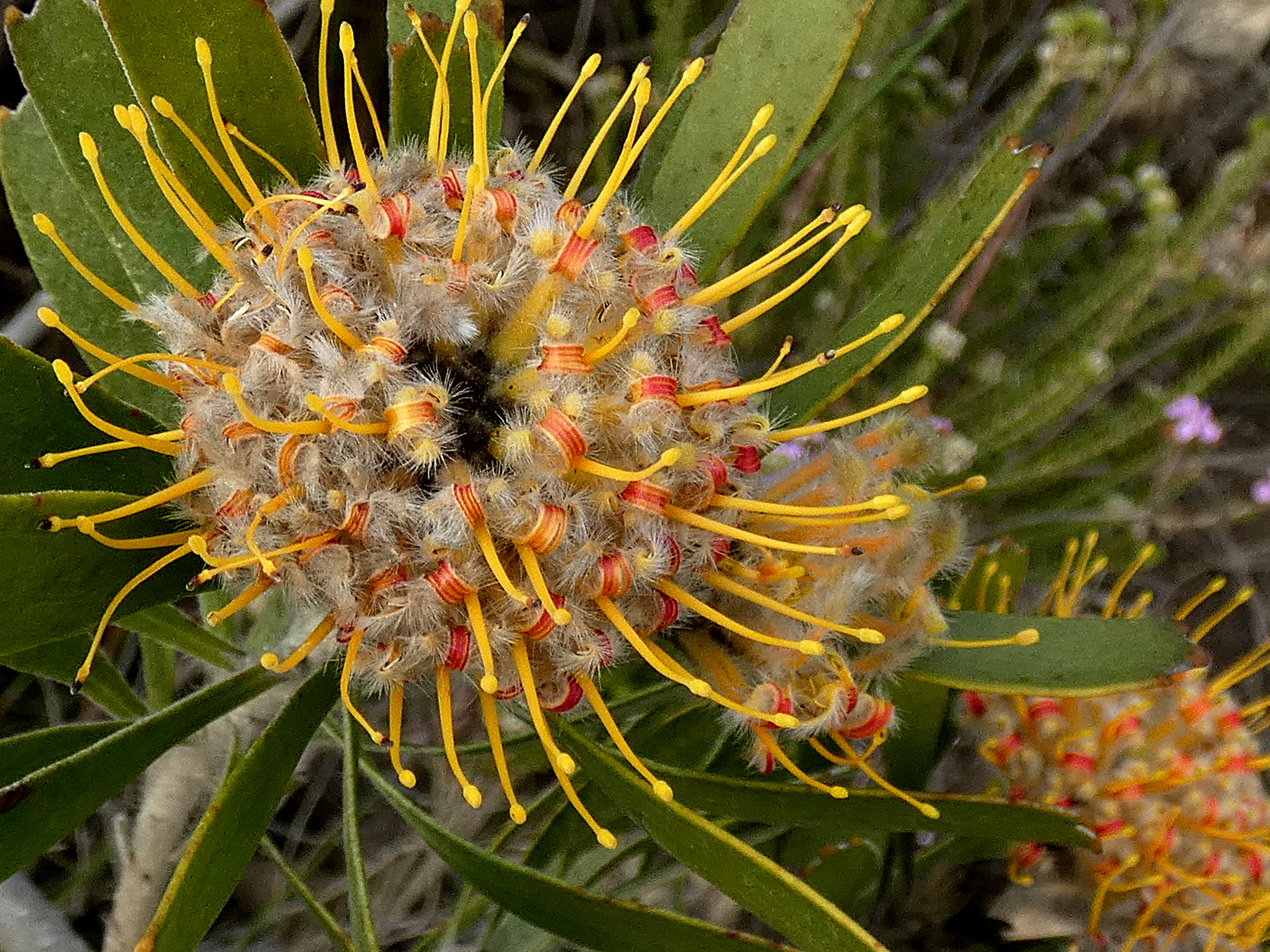

Conservation status
- Near Threatened (IUCN 3.1)

Scientific classification
- Kingdom: Plantae
- Clade: Embryophytes
- Clade: Tracheophytes
- Clade: Angiosperms
- Clade: Eudicots
- Order: Proteales
- Family: Proteaceae
- Genus: Leucospermum
- Species: L. truncatum

Binomial name
- Leucospermum truncatum (H.Buek ex Meisn.) Rourke

Synonyms
- Leucospermum truncatum H.Buek in Drège, nomen nudum, Leucospermum zeyheri var. truncatum, Leucadendron truncatum

= Leucospermum truncatum =

Species of plant native to South Africa

Leucospermum truncatum, commonly known as the limestone pincushion, is a shrub native to South Africa. The flowers are initially bright yellow but turn orange with time. Flowers can be found between August and December.

== Description ==
Leucospermum truncatum is a rounded, upright, well-branched shrub of up to 2 m (6.6 ft) high, with a single main stem at its foot, covered in minute soft crinkly hairs. Its simple long spade-shaped leaves are set alternately, have a squared-off end, mostly with three (sometimes non, five or seven) blunt teeth with a rounded bony tip, 4.5–9 cm (1.8–3.5 in) long, and 8–15 mm (0.31–0.59 in) wide. The flowering stems are stiffly upright and 1/2 cm (0.20 in) in diameter.

The flower heads are globe-shaped, usually with two or three together and sit on a stalk of up to 2 cm (0.79 in) long. Each flowerhead of 3–4 cm (1.2–1.6 in) in diameter. The style is yellow in colour, 18–35 mm (0.71–1.38 in) long, straight or slightly bend towards the center of the flower head. The pollen-presenter, a thickening at the tip of the style (comparable with the "head" of the pin), is cylindric in shape with a blunt end, 1–2 mm (0.039–0.079 in) long, initially carrying bright yellow pollen. The stigma is a transverse groove at the very tip of the pollen-presenter. At the base of the ovary are four linear, so-called hypogynous scales of about 1 mm (0.039 in) long.

The subtribe Proteinae, to which the genus Leucospermum has been assigned, consistently has a basic chromosome number of twelve (2n=24).

== Taxonomy ==
The name Leucospermum truncatum was first used in 1843 by Heinrich Wilhelm Buek for a specimen that was collected by Johann Franz Drège in August 1831, just east of Cape Agulhas on a limestone hill. He however failed to add a description, and therefore L. truncatum H.Buek is a nomen nudum. In 1856, Carl Meissner used Buek's epithet for Leucospermum zeyheri var. truncatum, adding the necessary description in Latin. Otto Kuntze moved truncatum in 1891 to Leucadendron. John Patrick Rourke in 1967, raised Meissner's variety to a separate species and made the new combination Leucospermum truncatum.

== Distribution, habitat and ecology ==
Leucospermum truncatum grows in fynbos on the limestone ridge close to the coast from sea level to 240 m (790 ft) elevation, between Soetanysberg in the west, across the Bredasdorp district, to Vermaaklikheid. It can only be found on deposits of the Alexandria Formation. The roots of the plants often penetrate crevices in pure limestone outcrops. The species forms open thickets with Protea obtusifolia, Leucadendron meridianum and Leucadendron muirii. The average rainfall in the range of the limestone pincushion is about 40–50 cm (16–20 in) per year, most of which falls during the winter. The flowerheads are primarily pollinated by birds. The seeds are released from the fruit about two months after flowering and are collected by ants that store them underground (a seed dispersal strategy that is called myrmecochory). These plants rarely survive the fires that naturally occur every decade or two in the fynbos. When afterwards the rain carries specific chemicals that are created by the fire underground, the seeds germinate and the species is so "resurrected".
