= John Muir (South African naturalist) =

South African naturalist

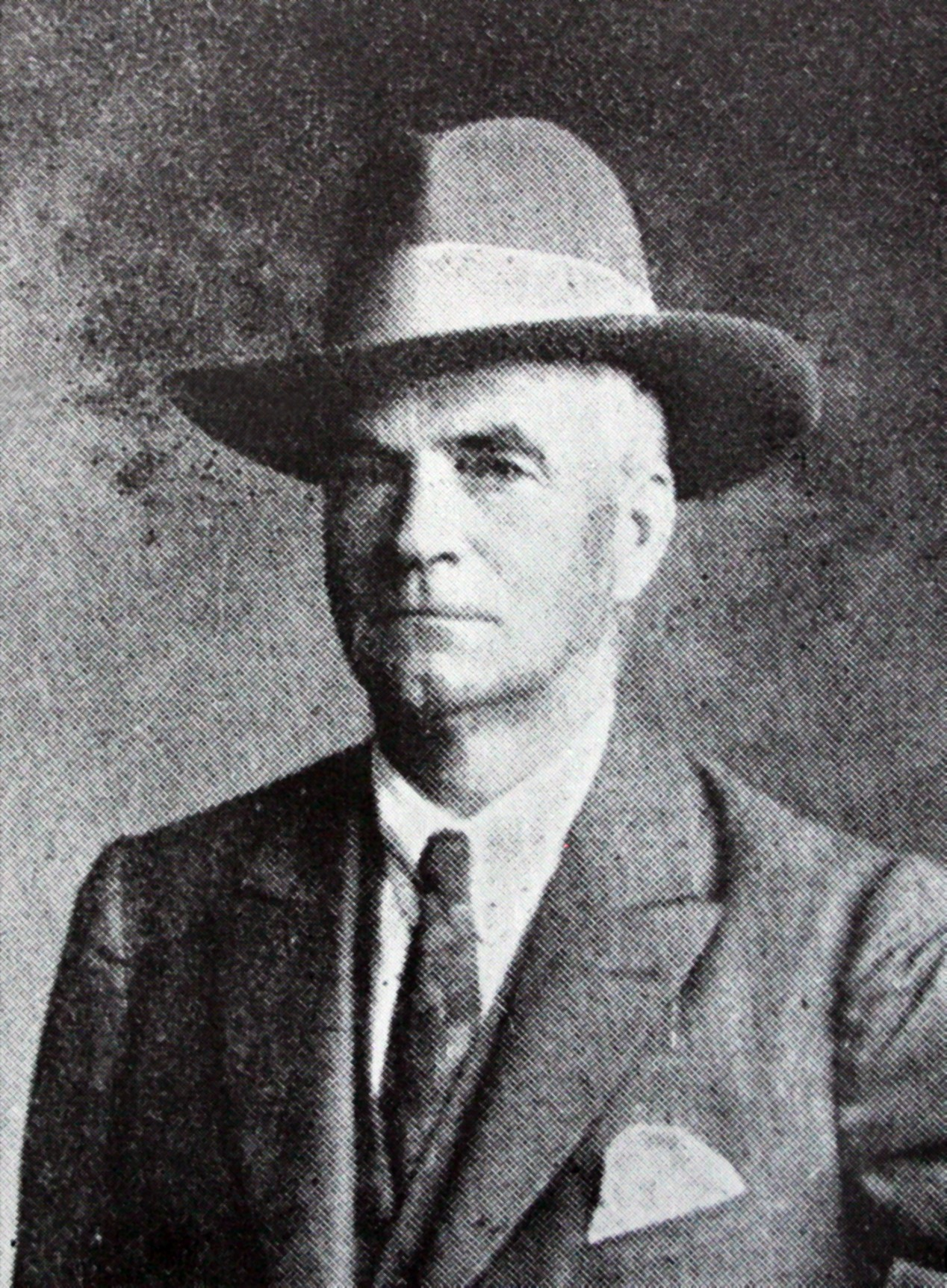

John Muir (18 June 1874, Castle Douglas, Scotland – 3 August 1947, Riversdale, Cape Province) was a medical doctor, naturalist and cultural historian.

== Education and career ==
John Muir spent the years 1890-1892 studying Arts and Medicine at the University of St Andrews. He enrolled at the University of Edinburgh in 1892, obtaining a M.B. and C.M. in 1896, and an M.D. in 1902. In 1896 he came to Cape Colony and practised at Worcester, Strydenburg, Sterkstroom and Albertinia before settling in Riversdale. He collected plants extensively in the area as well as seeds found along the coastline. He retired in 1923 to devote himself to these interests as well as the study of shells. He donated his collection of driftseeds to Stellenbosch University in 1929 for which he was awarded an honorary D.Sc. As the recipient of a Carnegie Travelling Grant, he went abroad to study other collections of ocean-borne fruits and seeds. He presented his herbarium to the National Herbarium, Pretoria. At this time he developed an interest in folklore and historical objects and published a number of papers on the subject, besides contributing vernacular names of birds, plants and shells to the Woordeboek van die Afrikaanse Taal. He donated his collection of shells to the South African Museum, some particularly minute species exciting a large amount of interest. Besides his botanical writings, he contributed a number of articles to popular scientific and socio-historical publications, a fair portion of these written in Afrikaans. He is commemorated in the genus Muiria N.E.Br. and in many species such as Leucospermum muirii Phillips, Erica muirii L.Bol., Leucadendron muirii Phillips and Conophytum muirii N.E.Br. His wife, born Susanna Steyn, is also remembered in Protea susannae Phillips and Thesium susannae A.W.Hill, while Muiria hortenseae N.E.Br. was named for his daughter, but is now lumped as a synonym of Gibbaeum hortenseae (N.E.Br.) Thiede & Klak. Vol. 17 of Flowering Plants of South Africa is dedicated to him.

== Publications ==
- The Flora of Riversdale, South Africa Mem. Bot. Surv. S.Afr. No.13 of 1929
- Seed-drift of South Africa Mem. Bot. Surv. S.Afr. No.16 of 1937
- Gewone Plantname in Riversdal
