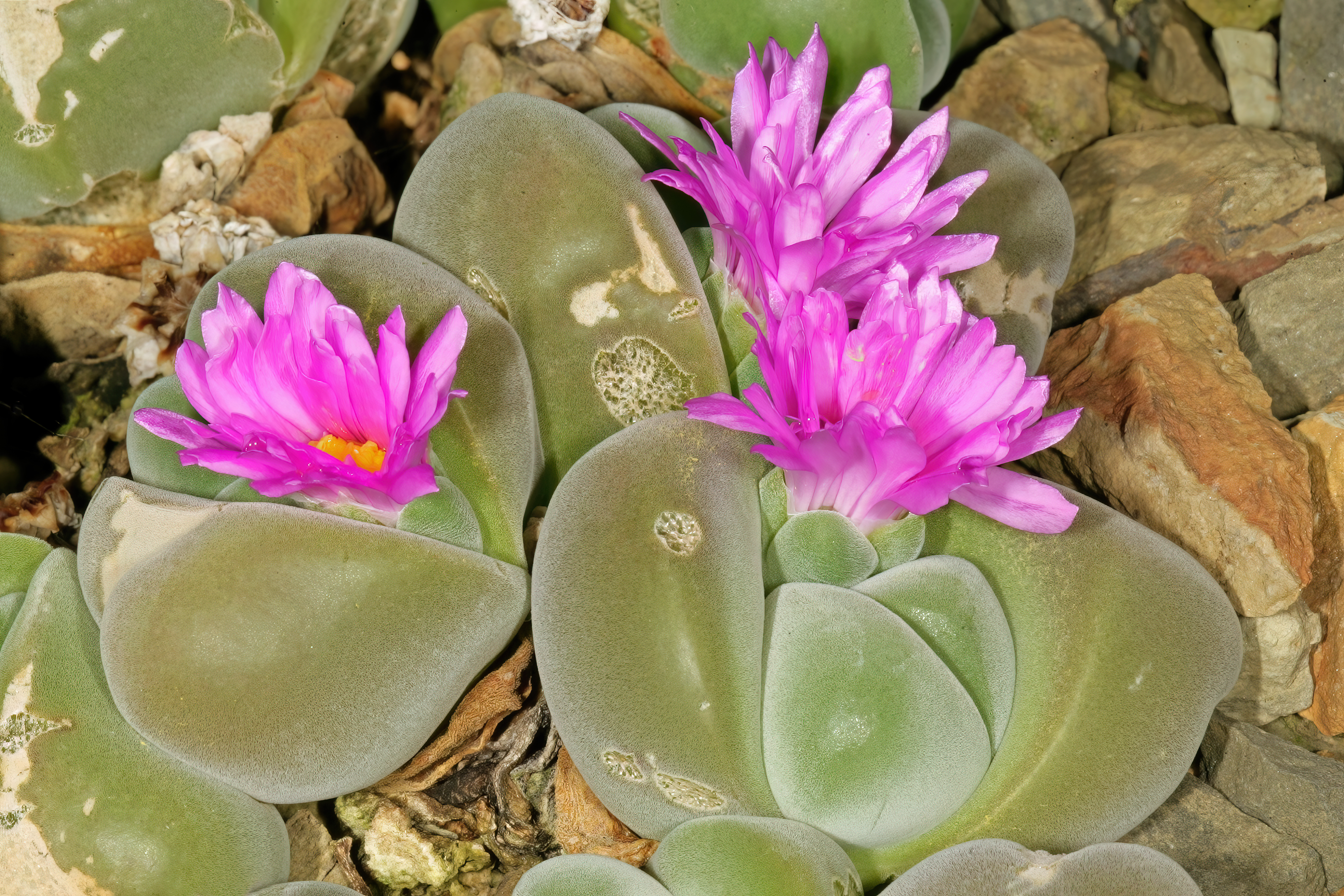
- Gibbaeum dispar at the Marsh Botanical Garden

Scientific classification
- Kingdom: Plantae
- Clade: Tracheophytes
- Clade: Angiosperms
- Clade: Eudicots
- Order: Caryophyllales
- Family: Aizoaceae
- Genus: Gibbaeum
- Species: G. dispar

Binomial name
- Gibbaeum dispar N.E.Br.

= Gibbaeum dispar =

Species of succulent

Gibbaeum dispar is a plant species in the family Aizoaceae, native to South Africa. It grows close to the ground and has short stems, causing it to grow in clumps.

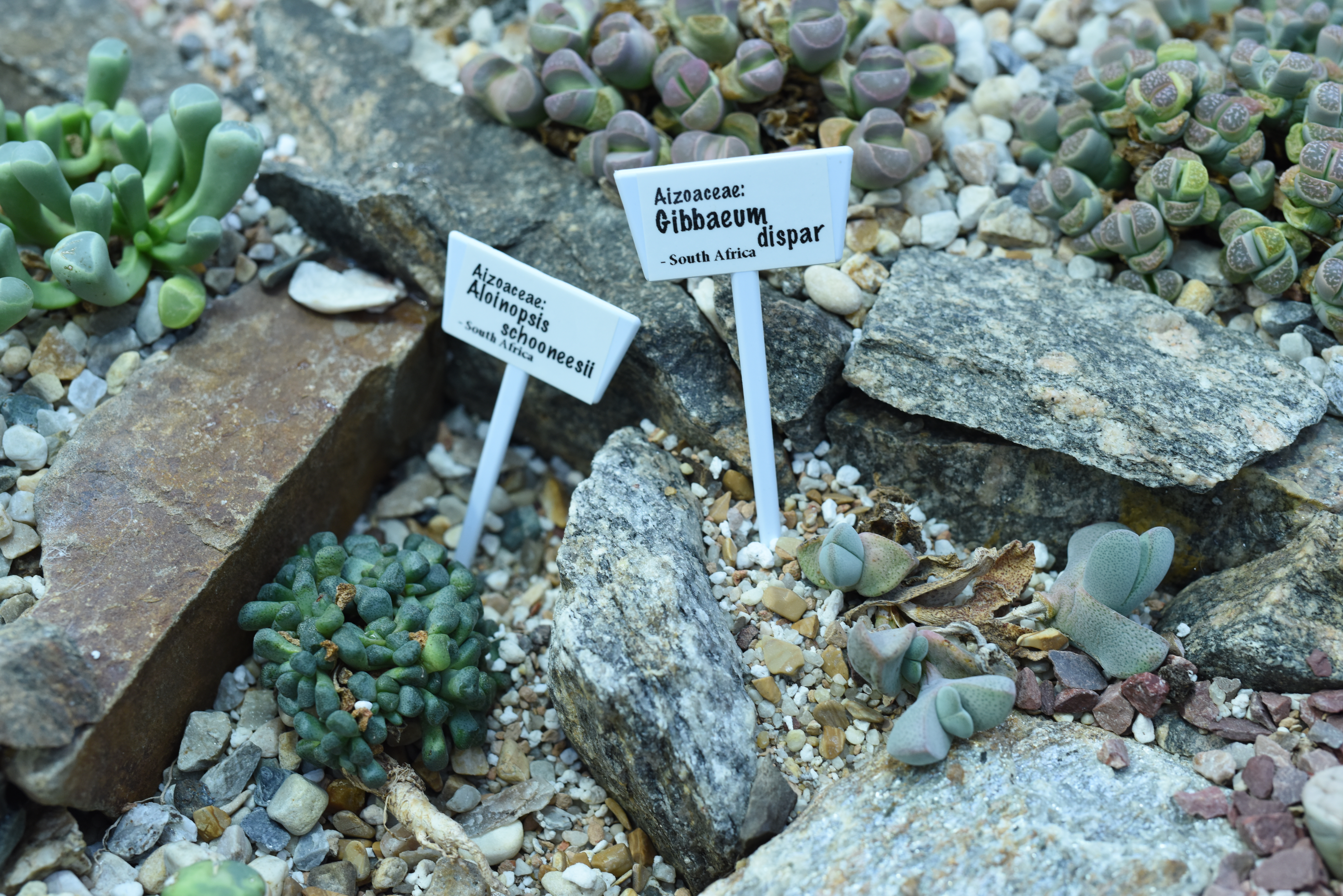

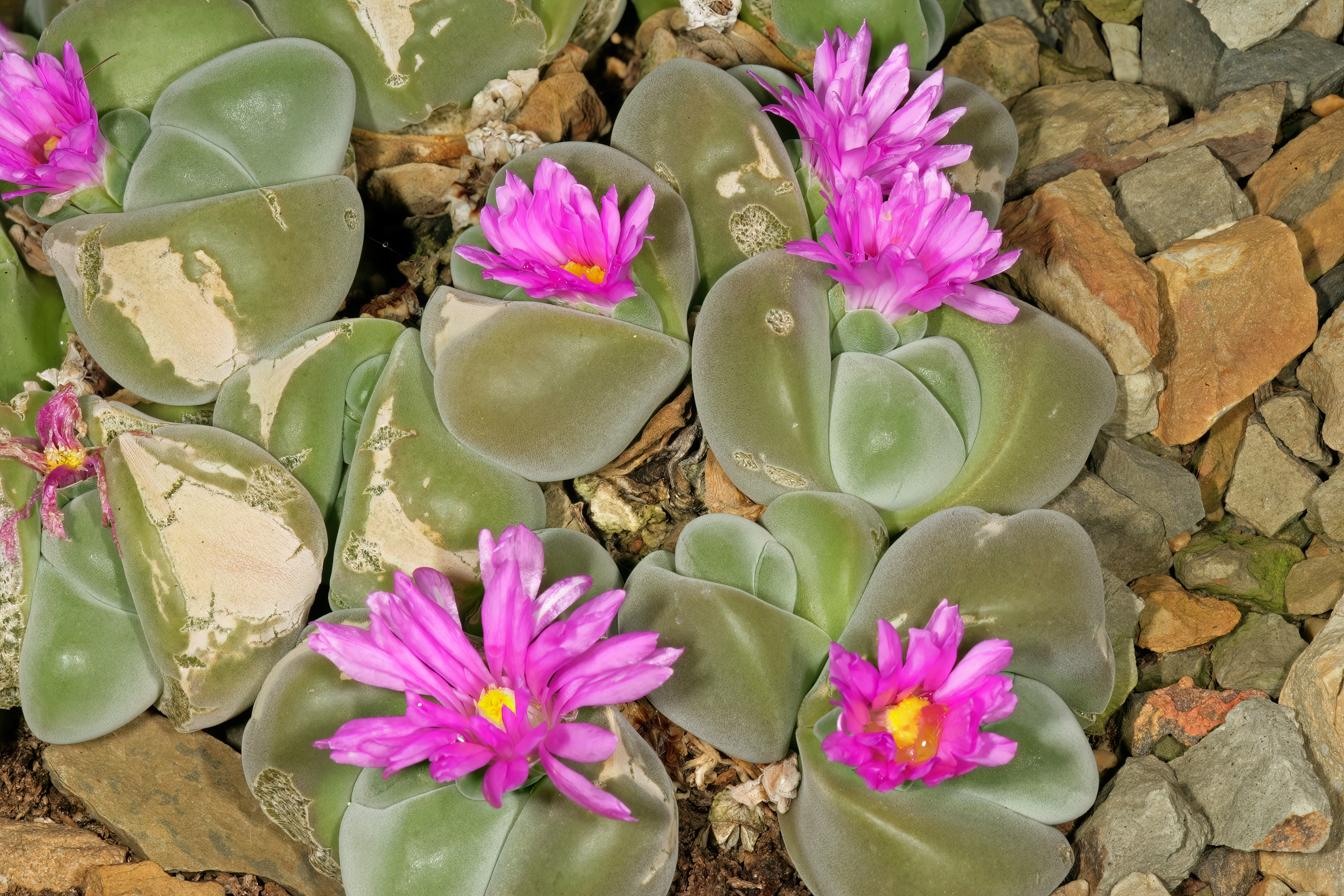
