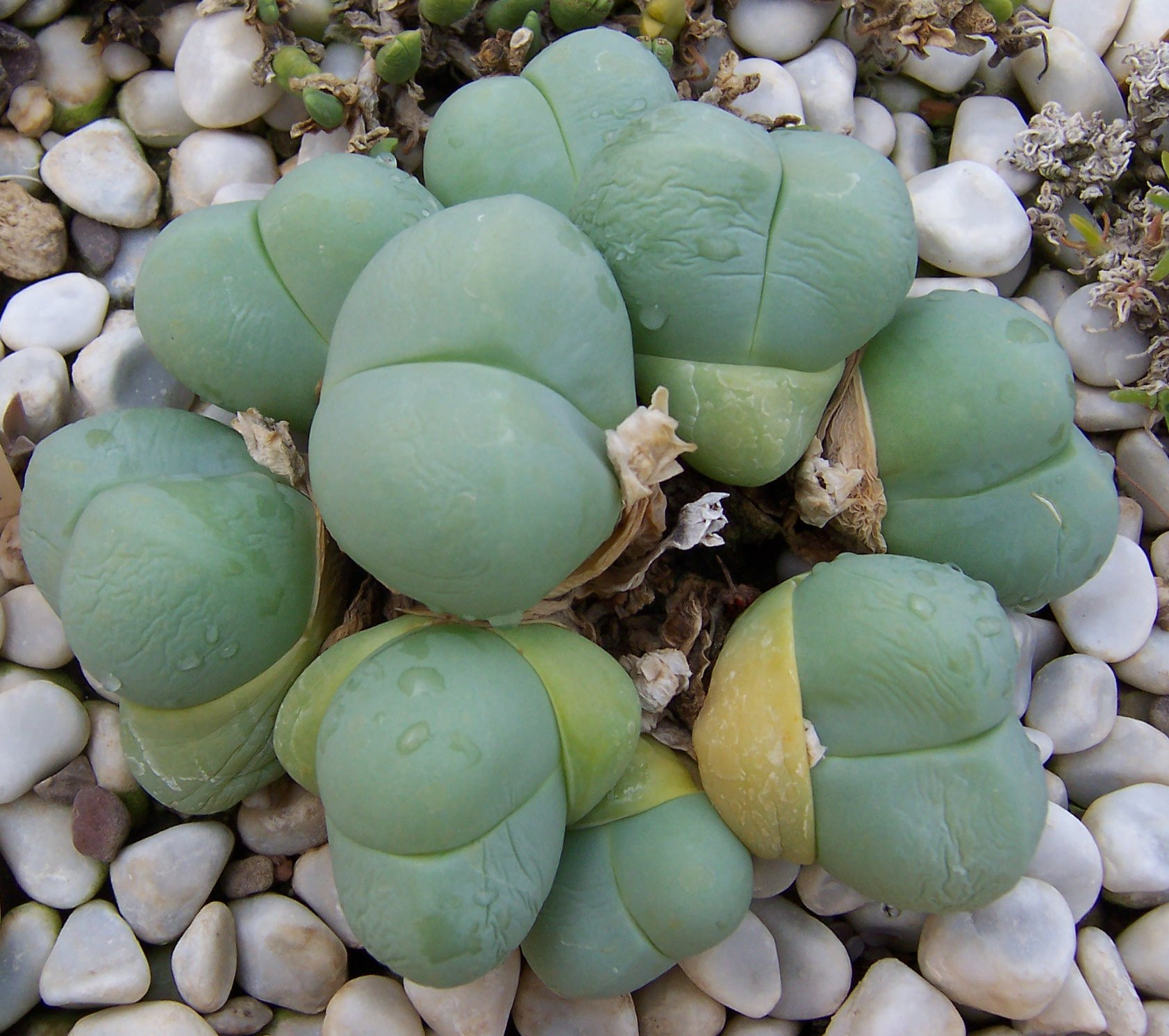
- Gibbaeum heathii

Scientific classification
- Kingdom: Plantae
- Clade: Tracheophytes
- Clade: Angiosperms
- Clade: Eudicots
- Order: Caryophyllales
- Family: Aizoaceae
- Subfamily: Ruschioideae
- Tribe: Ruschieae
- Genus: Gibbaeum; Haw. ex N.E.Br.

Species
- 17, see text

Synonyms
- Argeta N.E.Br.; Imitaria N.E.Br.; Mentocalyx N.E.Br.; Rimaria N.E.Br.

= Gibbaeum =

Genus of succulents

Gibbaeum is a genus of about 17 species of small succulent plants of the family Aizoaceae, indigenous to the Little Karoo region of South Africa. The name "Gibbaeum" comes from the Latin gibbosus (hunchback)

== Description ==
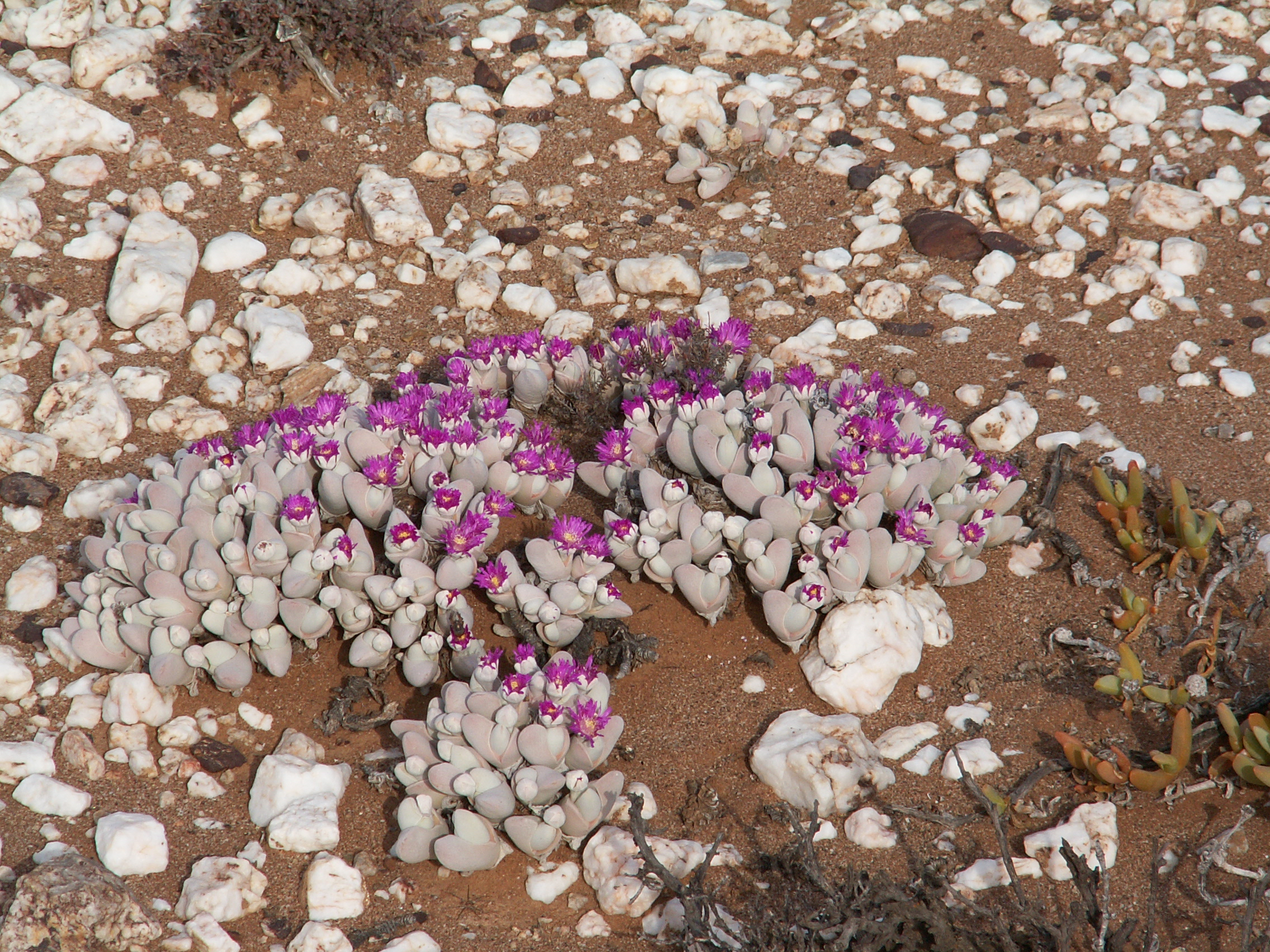
Gibbaeum pubescens in natural habitat.

These dwarf succulents are characterized by distinctively asymmetrical pairs of leaves, mostly globular or sometimes thick and arcuate. The sizes of the leaves of each pair are nearly always different. Gibbaeums grow in clumps and produce pink or white flowers in spring.

== Distribution ==
Genus Gibbaeum is predominantly indigenous to the Little Karoo region of the Western Cape Province, South Africa. A few species extend outside of this region. Three species extend north into the Great Karoo region: Gibbaeum gibbosum, Gibbaeum heathii and Gibbaeum nuciforme. Two extend south into the Overberg region: Gibbaeum esterhuyseniae and Gibbaeum hartmannianum.

== Cultivation ==
Sunny exposure and well drained soil. Their natural range spans the boundary between winter and summer rainfall areas of southern Africa, and their growth period (emergence of new leaves and flowering) is therefore in summer for some species and in winter for other ones. However, overall most species can be watered primarily in winter. Temperature must stay above 10 °C in winter.

Propagation can be done by cuttings or by seeds. Many of the species hybridise easily - with each other and with the related genus Muiria.

== Species ==
17 species are accepted.

- Gibbaeum album N.E.Br.
- Gibbaeum angulipes L.Bolus) N.E.Br.
- Gibbaeum dispar N.E.Br.
- Gibbaeum esterhuyseniae L.Bolus
- Gibbaeum geminum N.E.Br.
- Gibbaeum gibbosum (Haw.) N.E.Br.
- Gibbaeum hartmannianum Thiede & Niesler
- Gibbaeum heathii (N.E.Br.) L.Bolus
- Gibbaeum ihlenfeldtii Thiede
- Gibbaeum nebrownii Tischler
- Gibbaeum nuciforme (Haw.) Glen & H.E.K.Hartmann
- Gibbaeum pachypodium (Kensit) L.Bolus
- Gibbaeum petrense (N.E.Br.) Tischler
- Gibbaeum pilosulum (N.E.Br.) N.E.Br.
- Gibbaeum pubescens (Haw.) N.E.Br.
- Gibbaeum shandi N.E.Br.
- Gibbaeum velutinum (L.Bolus) Schwantes
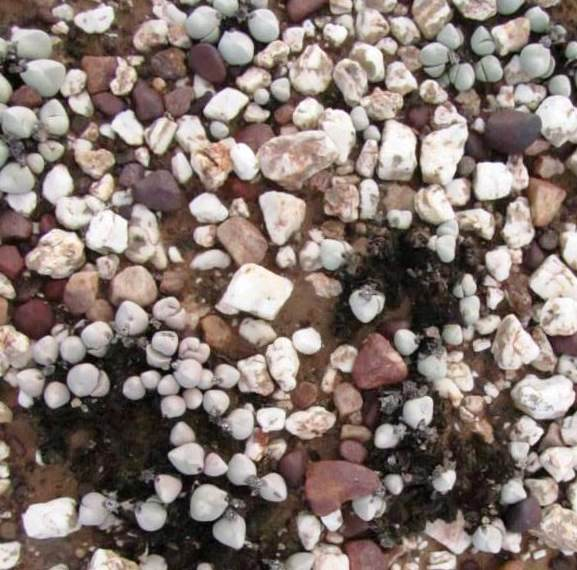
Gibbaeum album

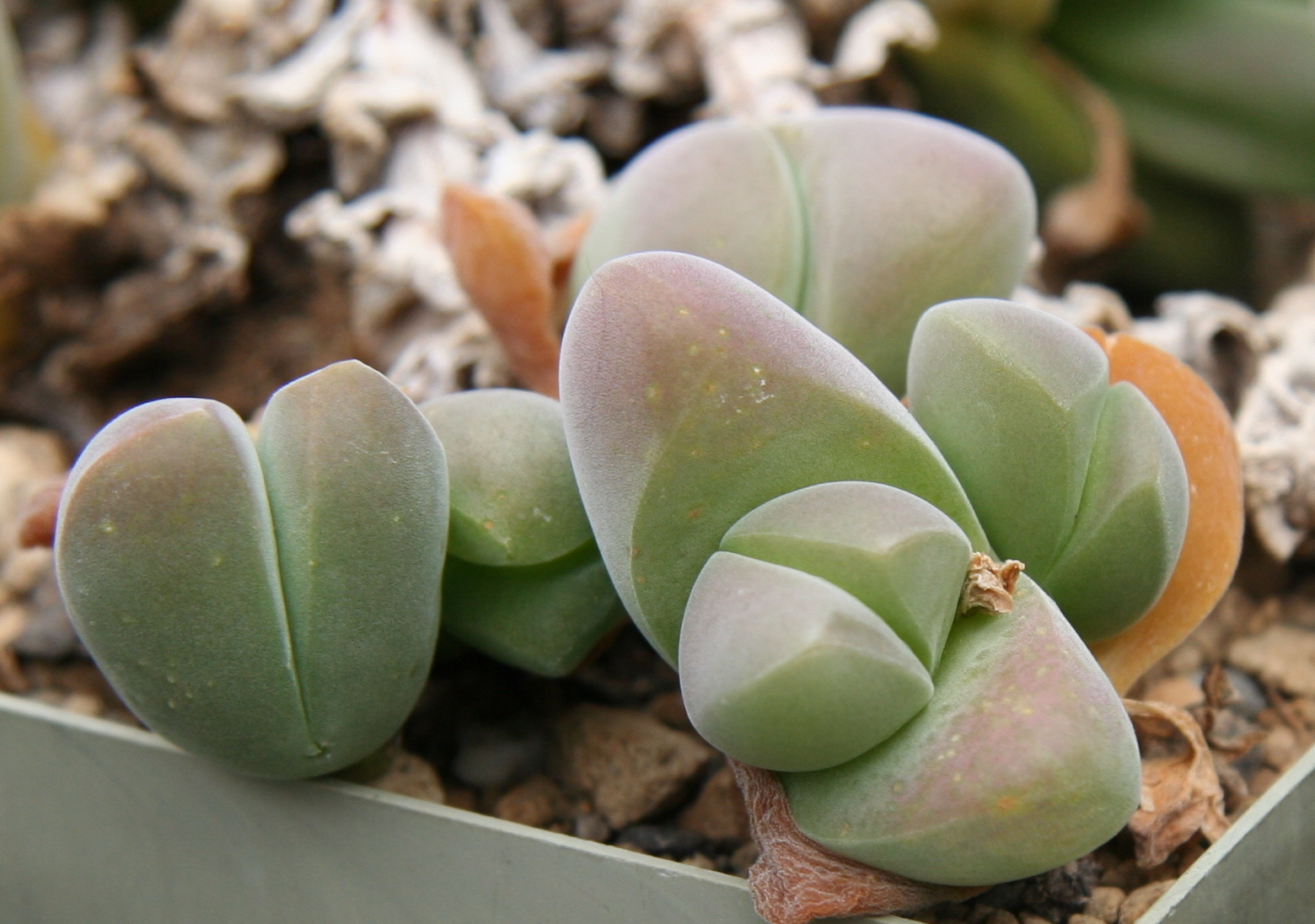
Gibbaeum dispar

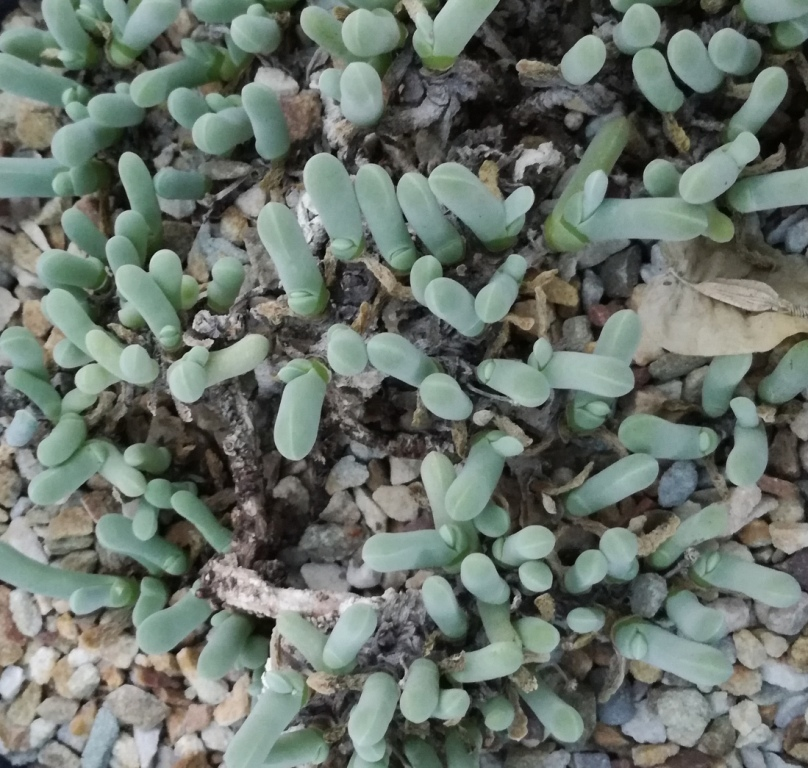
Gibbaeum geminum

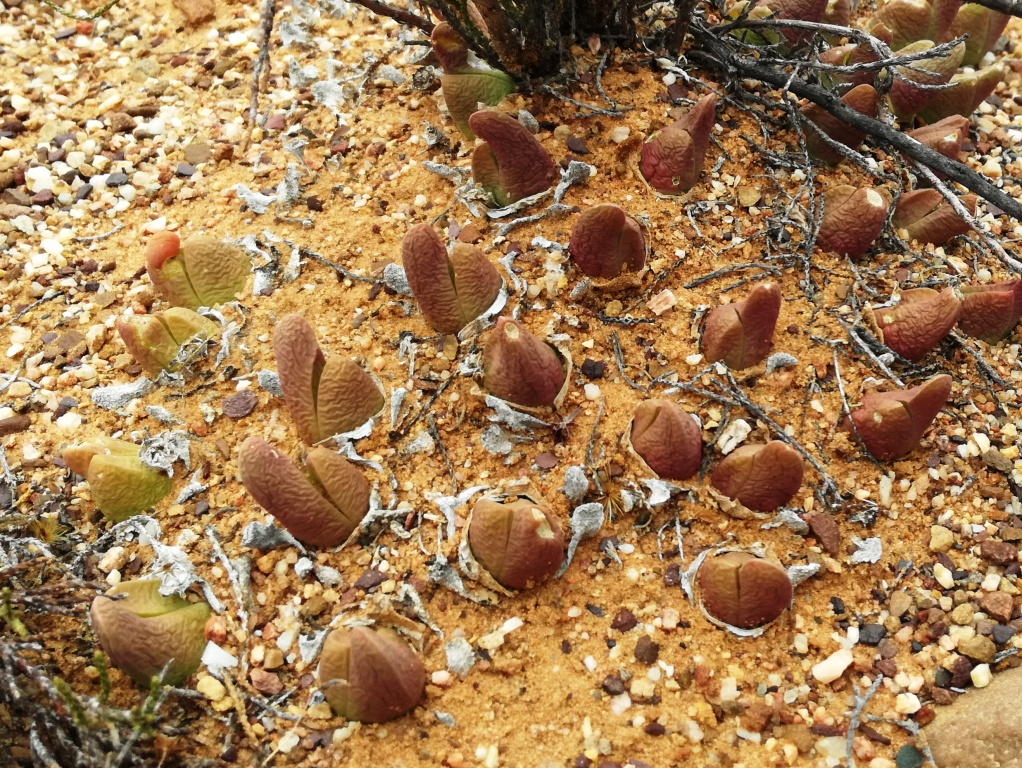
Gibbaeum gibbosum

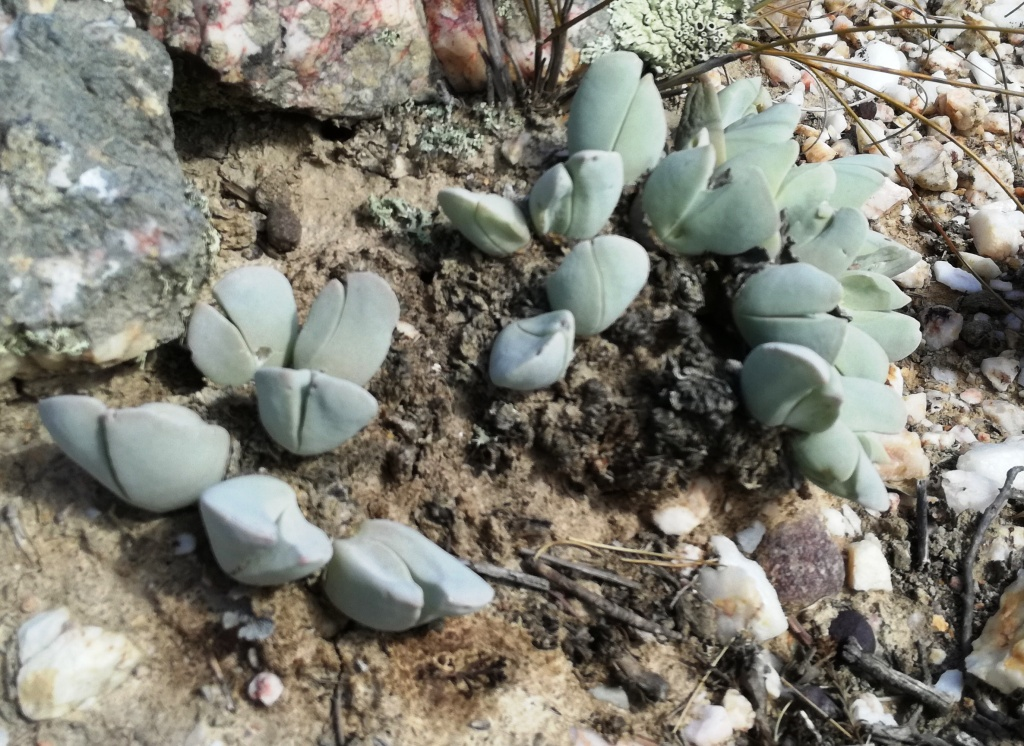
Gibbaeum hartmannianum

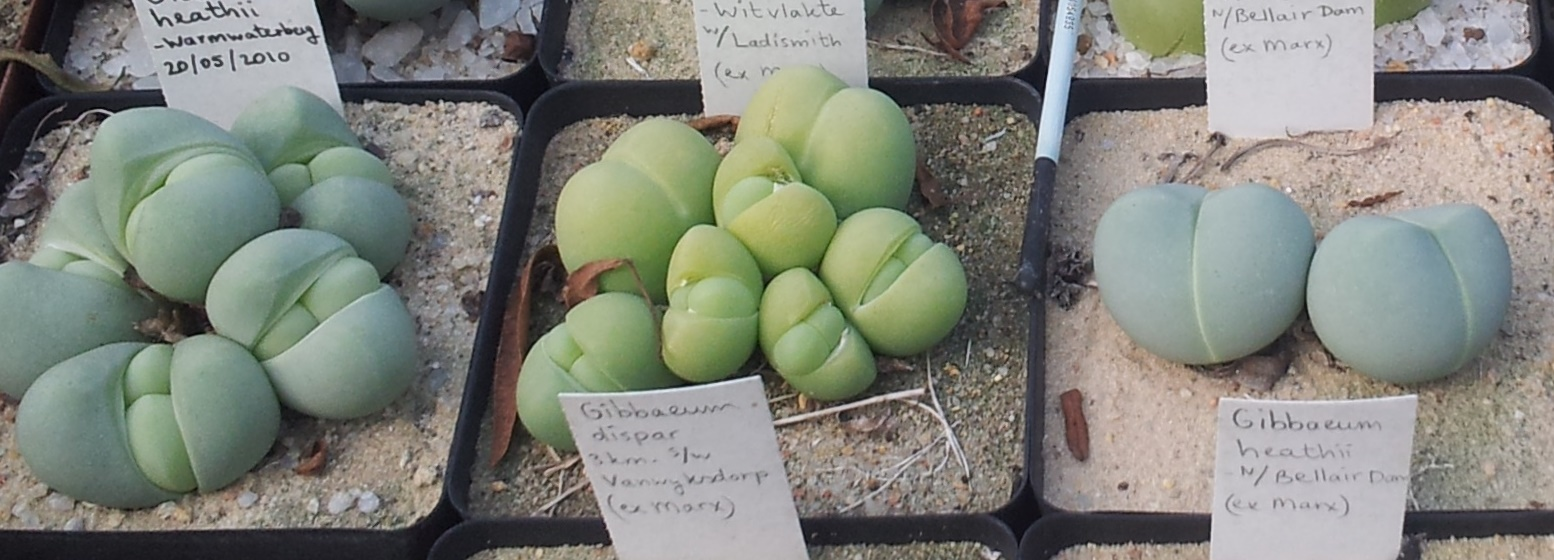
Gibbaeum heathii forms

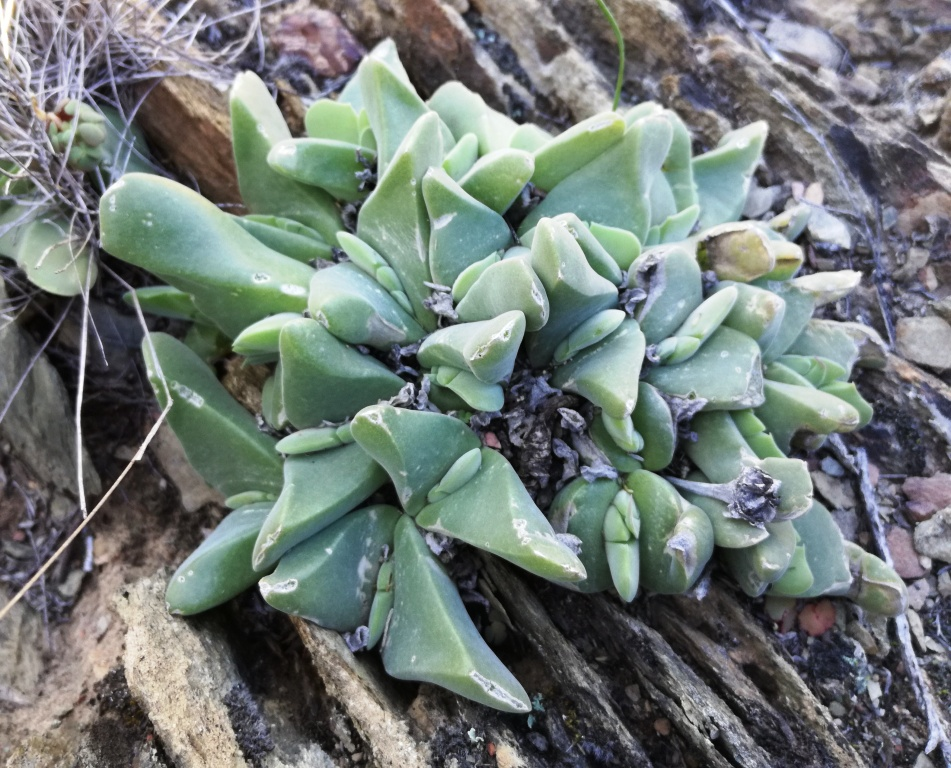
Gibbaeum velutinum

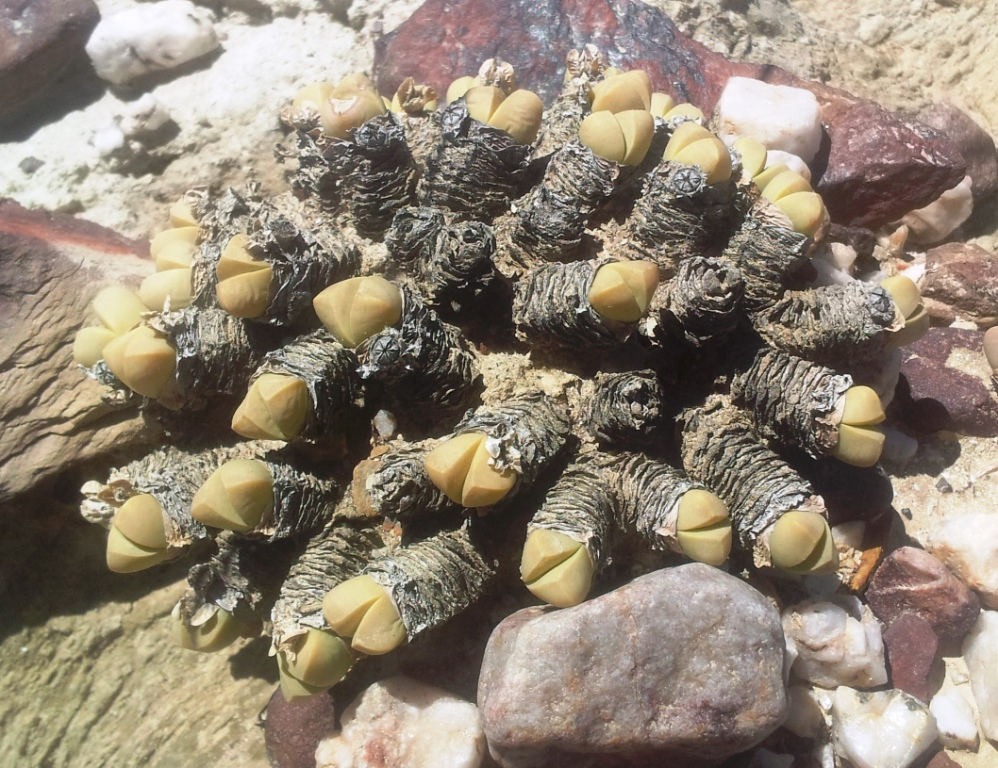
Gibbaeum petrense

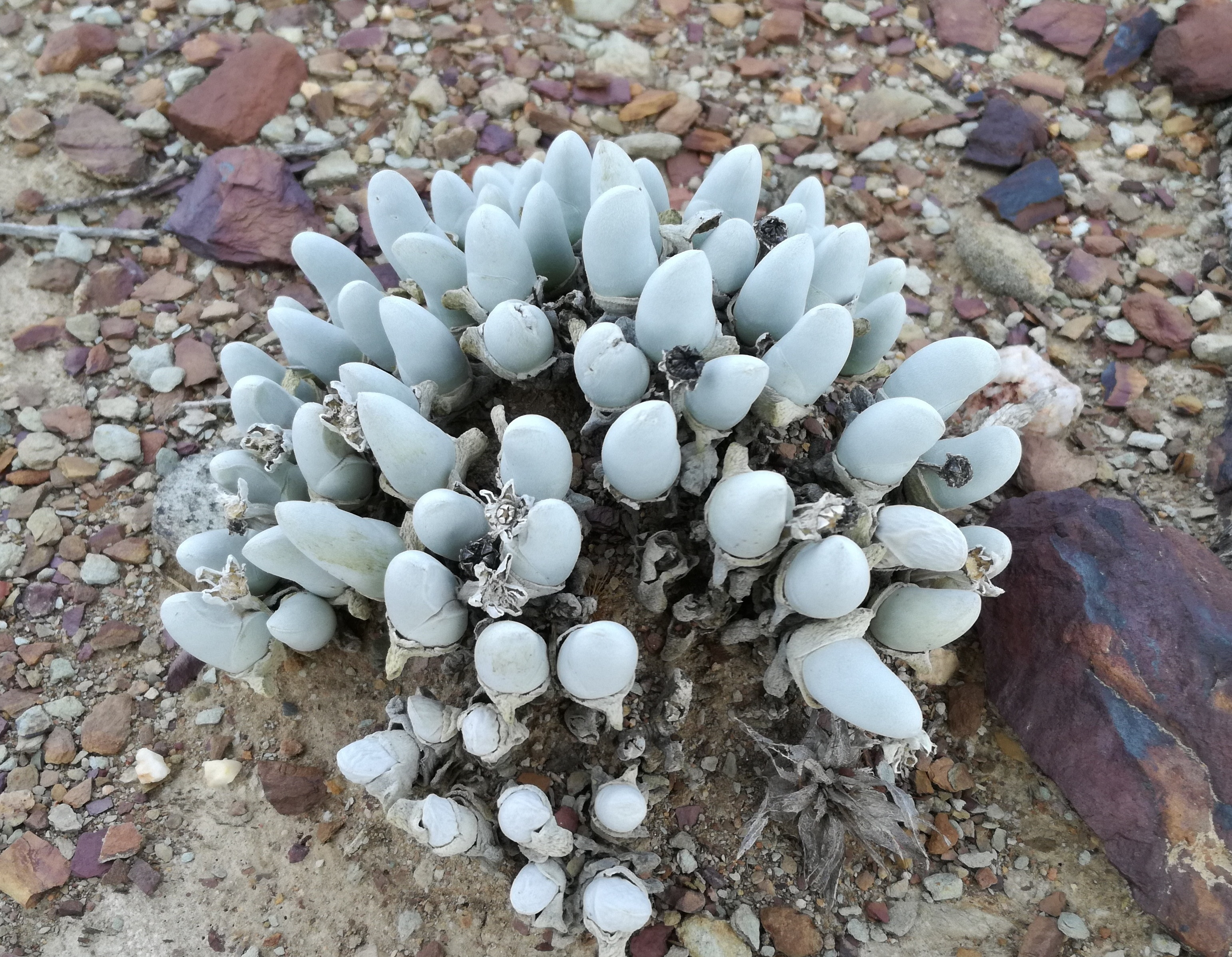
Gibbaeum pubescens

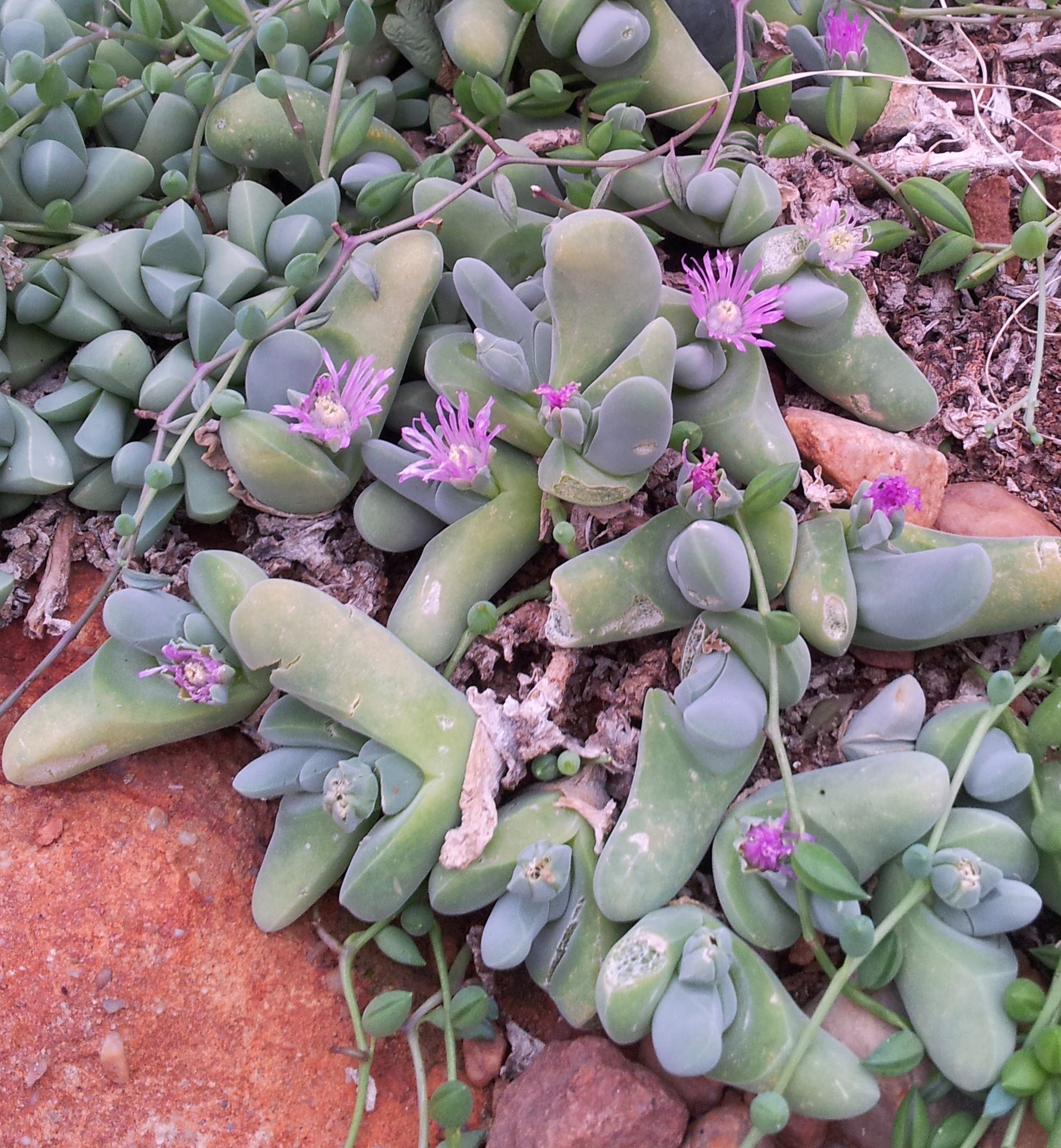
Gibbaeum pubescens var. shandii

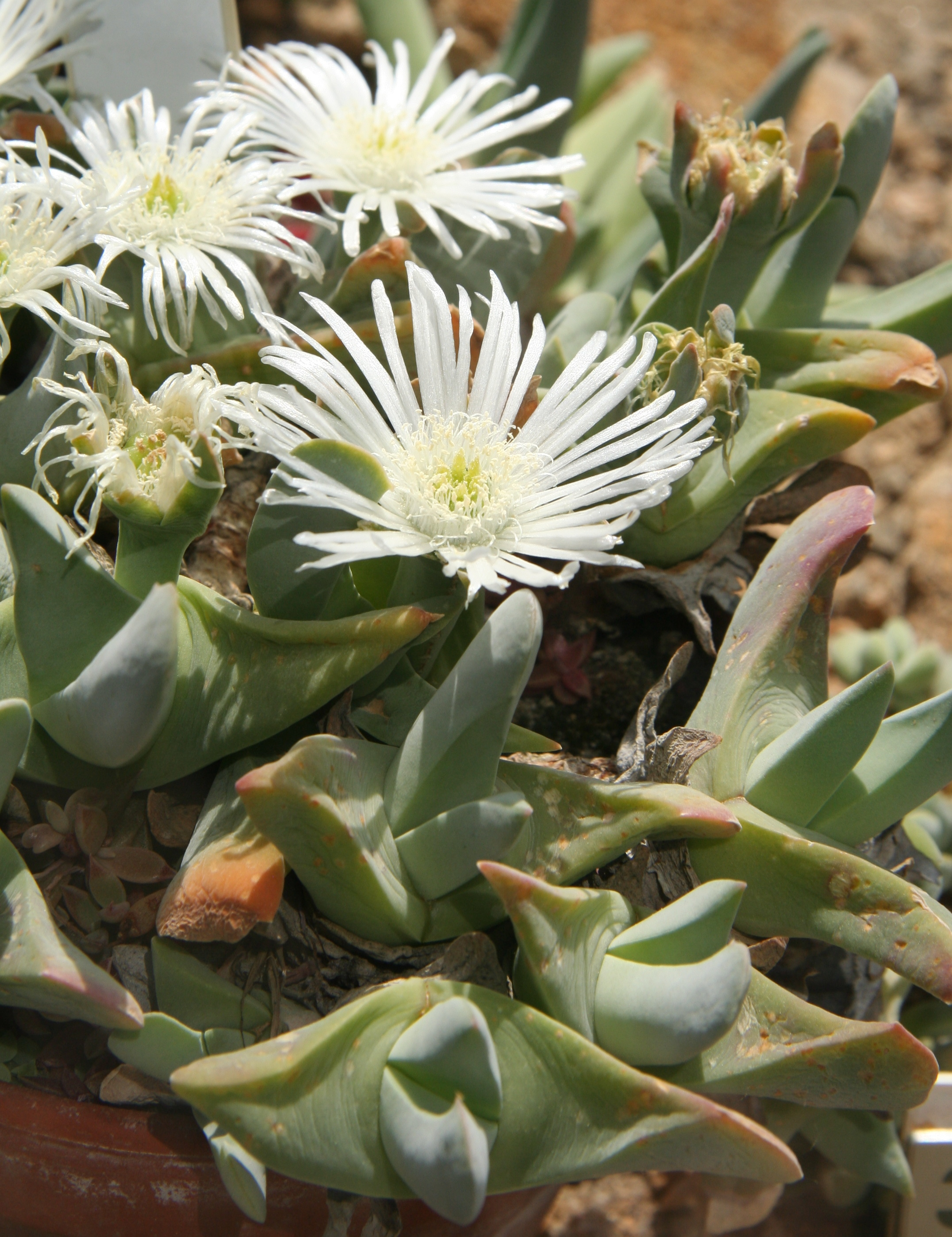
Gibbaeum schwantesii

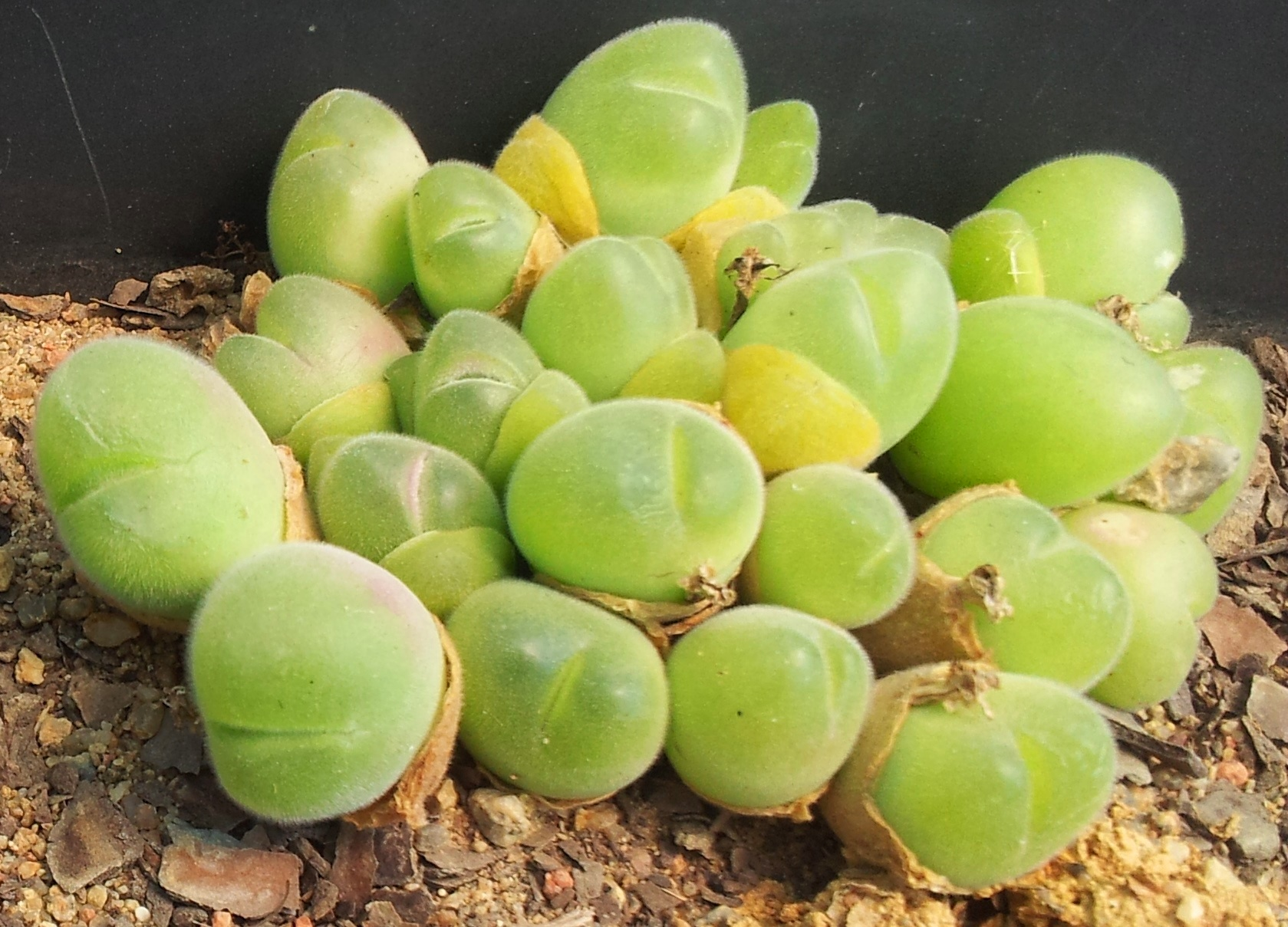
Gibbaeum pilosulum

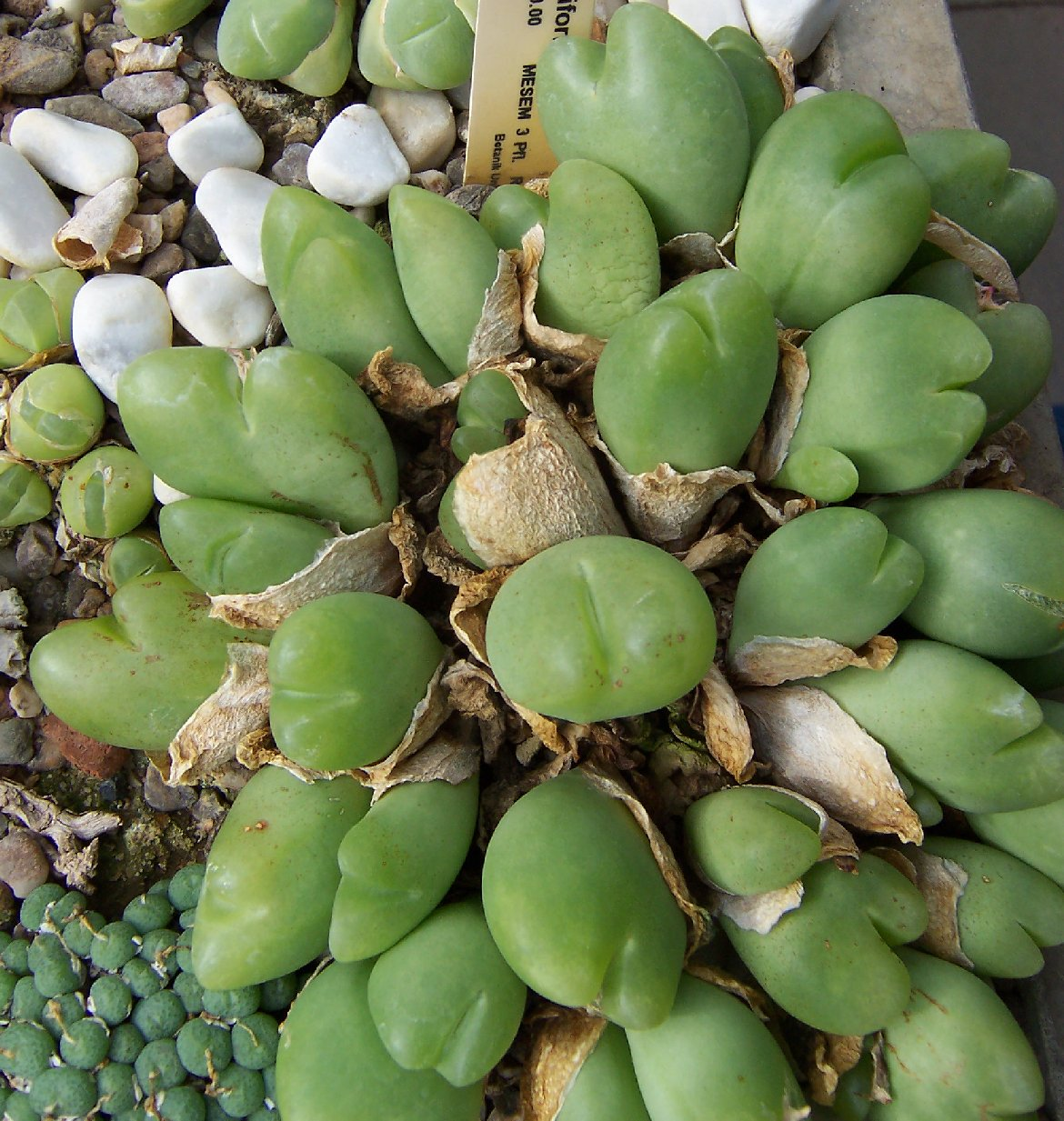
Gibbaeum nuciforme

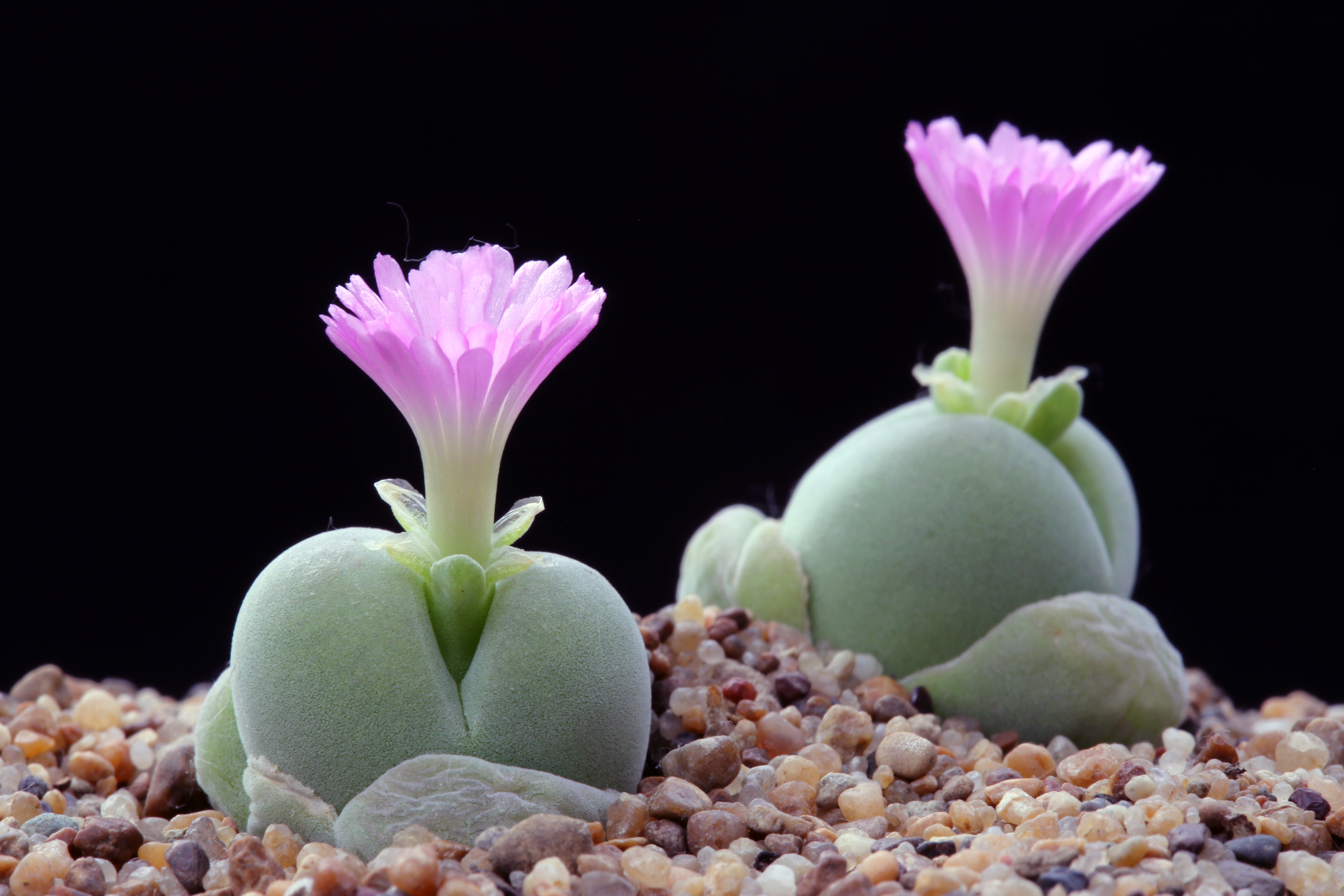
Gibbaeum nebrownii
