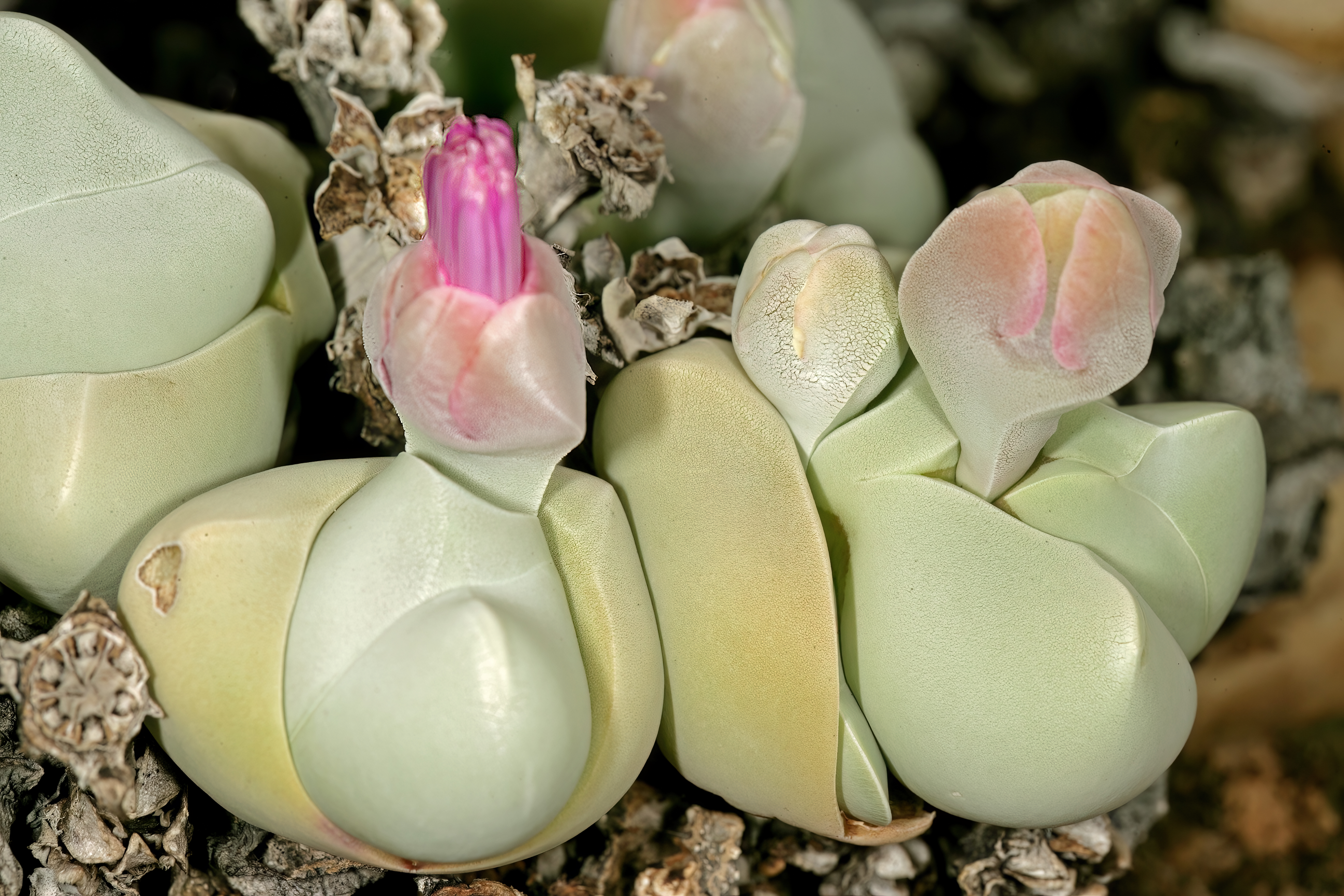

Conservation status
- Critically Endangered (IUCN 3.1)

Scientific classification
- Kingdom: Plantae
- Clade: Tracheophytes
- Clade: Angiosperms
- Clade: Eudicots
- Order: Caryophyllales
- Family: Aizoaceae
- Genus: Gibbaeum
- Species: G. album

Binomial name
- Gibbaeum album N.E.Br. (1926)

Synonyms
- Gibbaeum album var. roseum N.E.Br.

= Gibbaeum album =

Species of plant

Gibbaeum album, also known as shark's mouth mesemb, is a small species of succulent in the family Aizoaceae. It is endemic to the Western Cape province in South Africa. It is found in the northern parts of the Langeberg in the Barrydale region. There are two sub-populations known, but the population of one has substantially reduced due to road construction. The surviving population is threatened due to encroachment by horticulturists.
