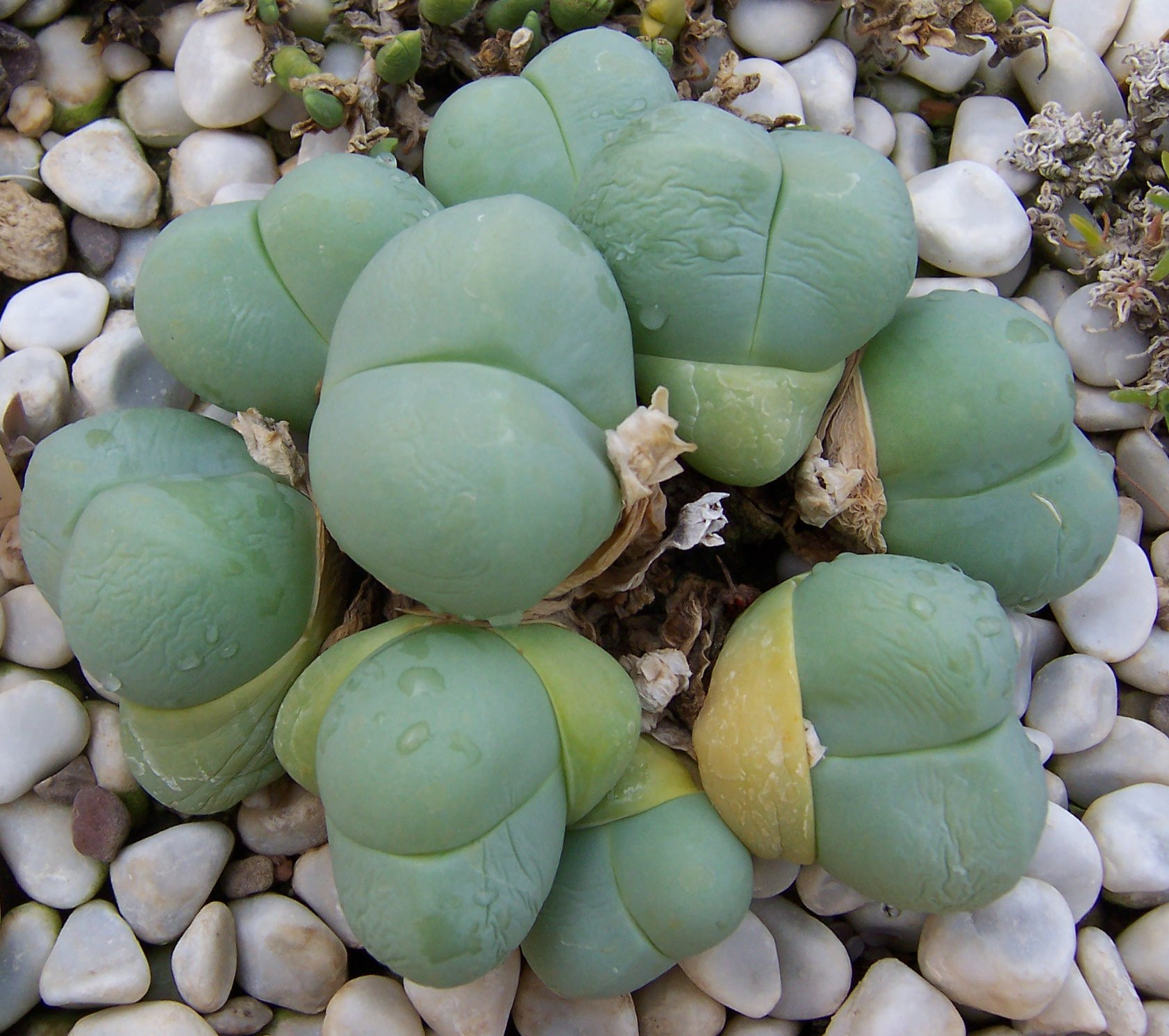

Scientific classification
- Kingdom: Plantae
- Clade: Tracheophytes
- Clade: Angiosperms
- Clade: Eudicots
- Order: Caryophyllales
- Family: Aizoaceae
- Genus: Gibbaeum
- Species: G. heathii

Binomial name
- Gibbaeum heathii (N.E.Br.) L.Bolus

Synonyms
- Gibbaeum blackburnii L.Bolus; Gibbaeum comptonii (L.Bolus) L.Bolus; Gibbaeum dubium (N.E.Br.) H.Jacobsen; Gibbaeum luckhoffii L.Bolus; Mesembryanthemum heathii N.E.Br. Rimaria comptonii L.Bolus; Rimaria dubia N.E.Br. Rimaria heathii (N.E.Br.) N.E.Br. Rimaria luckhoffii (L.Bolus) L.Bolus

= Gibbaeum heathii =

Species of succulent

Gibbaeum heathii is a species of succulent plant in the genus Gibbaeum, endemic to South Africa.

== Description ==
This is a small compact succulent, with rounded leaf-pairs that are covered in a fine down. It offsets and eventually can form a large clump. This highly variable species has a large number of different varieties.

== Distribution ==
This species is indigenous to an arid area of the Western Cape Province, South Africa, and specifically around the Little Karoo districts of Montagu, Ladismith and Swellendam, where it grows on hot open rocky plains. It favours loam among rocky quartz gravel.

== Cultivation ==
Gibbaeum heathii requires extremely well-drained loamy soil, and some protection from all-day full sun.

It is adapted for a very arid environment, and should receive only occasional water all year round.

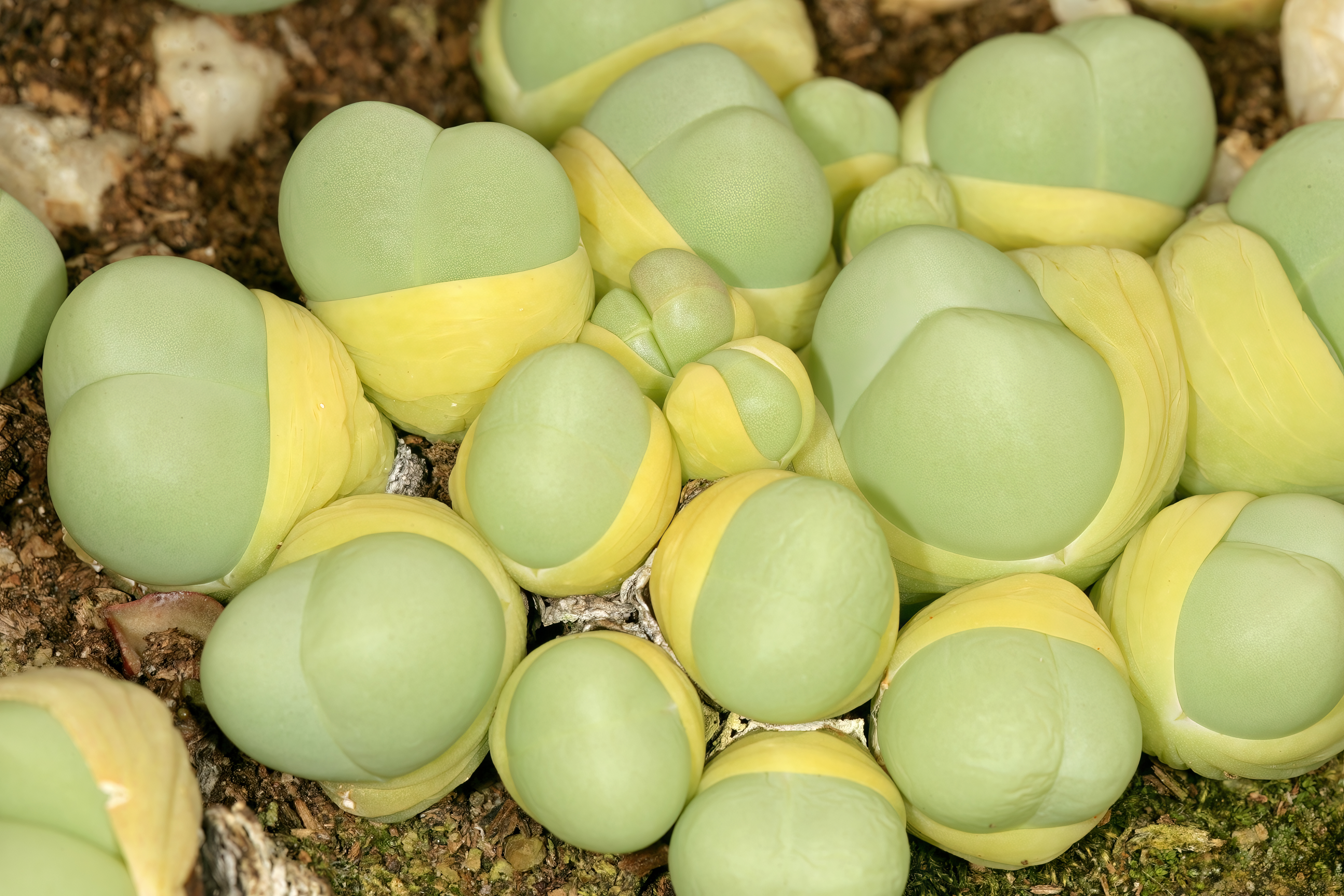
