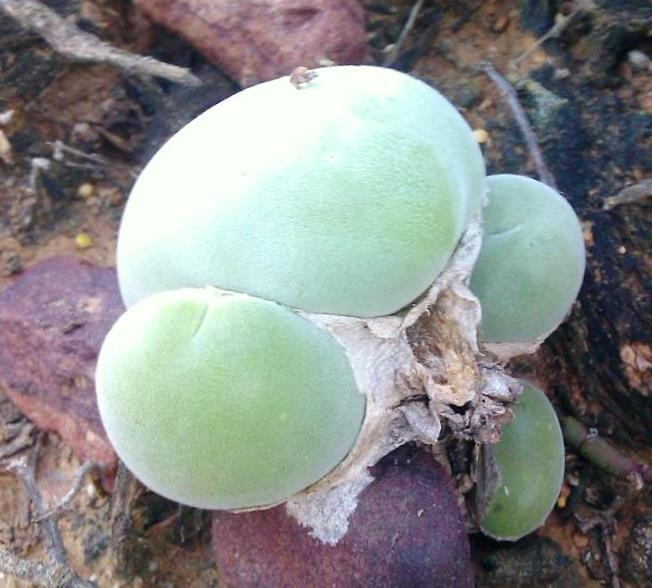

Scientific classification
- Kingdom: Plantae
- Clade: Tracheophytes
- Clade: Angiosperms
- Clade: Eudicots
- Order: Caryophyllales
- Family: Aizoaceae
- Subfamily: Ruschioideae
- Tribe: Ruschieae
- Genus: Muiria; N.E.Br.
- Species: M. hortenseae

Binomial name
- Muiria hortenseae N.E.Br.

= Muiria =

Genus of succulents

Muiria hortenseae ("mouse-head") is a rare dwarf species of succulent plant of the iceplant family (Aizoaceae), indigenous to a very small area in the Little Karoo, Western Cape, South Africa. It is the only species in the monotypic genus Muiria.

== Description ==
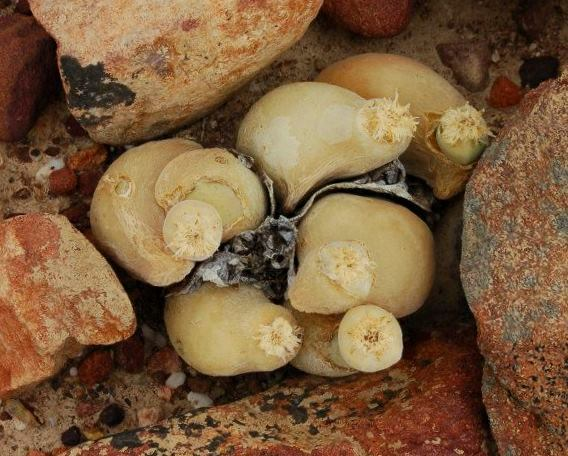
Muiria in dormancy, in papery sheaths after finishing flowering.

Unlike most other plants in its family, Muiria is covered in soft downy fur (from which it gets its common name) and has leaves that are entirely fused together, into one smooth rounded body.

In the summer it produces white or pink flowers, that tear through the (still living) flesh of the plant. The flesh then withers into a papery sheath, within which the new body forms. After several generations of subdivisions, it can form clumps.

== Life-cycle ==
Like many related plants, Muiria grows in annual cycles of growth and dormancy.

Their habitat is a winter rainfall region. They therefore begin their growth cycle in early autumn when the first rains arrive, pushing out of the dry sheaths which remain from the previous years dead leaves, and forming the new green growth. Throughout the winter, they receive mists and occasional rainfall. By the end of winter, the new growth stops and appears to decay, becoming more yellow and soft in the spring. The flower buds can then push through the softened flesh.

With the onset of the full summer drought, flowering ends, the old flesh gradually dries into a papery sheath and the plants enter a brief dormancy which can last any period between a few weeks and four months. The first new rains bring it out of dormancy and commence the cycle again.

== Distribution and habitat ==
Muiria is indigenous to a tiny arid area (c.300 mm annual rainfall) of the "Succulent Karoo" in the Western Cape, South Africa. Its habitat is the quartzite rubble that overlay clay soils on the low ridges near the Langeberg Mountains.

In this extremely small range, it has recently suffered an enormous reduction in population and range, due to habitat loss, trampling by stock animals and illegal collecting.

== Cultivation ==
Muiria hortenseae is difficult to cultivate, as it requires sparing but steady watering throughout most of the year (a sharply contrasting opinion is that of Alfred Byrd Graf who recommends that Muiria hortenseae be watered only once a year), generous space for its large root system, and a rocky, gritty, extremely well-drained soil. Some cultivators also occasionally add one or two grains of salt to the soil surface to add an extremely slight salinity to the soil. It is also recommended to give it little to no water for a drought of a month or two, after it has flowered.

Propagation is usually by seed, and Muiria sometimes hybridises with Gibbaeum album, with which it shares its natural habitat in the Little Karoo.
