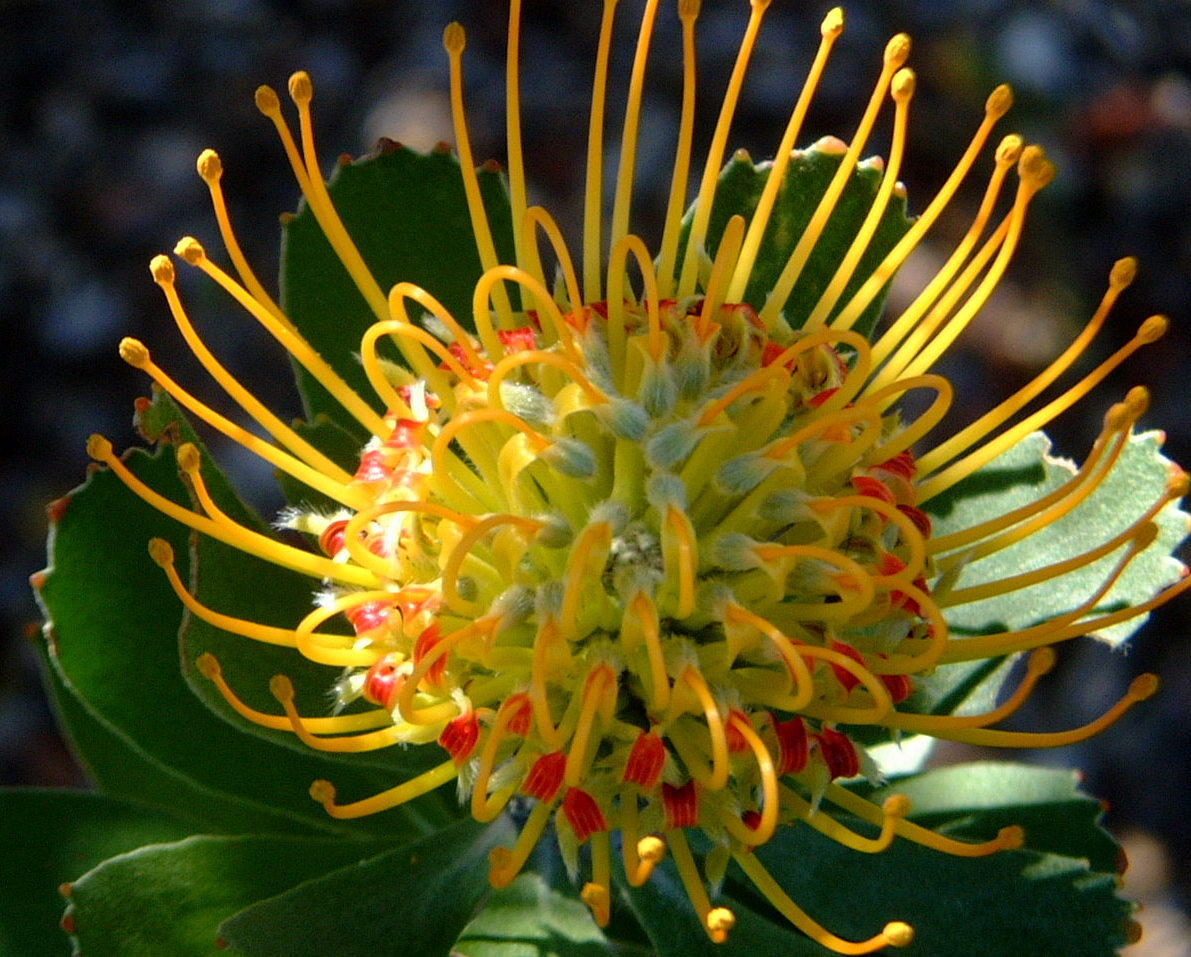

Conservation status
- Vulnerable (IUCN 3.1)

Scientific classification
- Kingdom: Plantae
- Clade: Embryophytes
- Clade: Tracheophytes
- Clade: Angiosperms
- Clade: Eudicots
- Order: Proteales
- Family: Proteaceae
- Genus: Leucospermum
- Species: L. praecox

Binomial name
- Leucospermum praecox Phillips, 1910

= Leucospermum praecox =

Species of plant native to South Africa

Leucospermum praecox is an evergreen, rounded, upright shrub of up to 3 m (9 ft) high, and 4 m (12 ft) in diameter that is assigned to the family Proteaceae. It has hairless, inverted egg-shaped to broadly wedge-shaped leaves of about 5 cm (2 in) long with six to eleven teeth near the tip, globe-shaped flower head with initially yellow flowers, later orange or scarlet, with styles sticking far out, giving the head the appearance of a pincushion. It is called Mossel Bay pincushion or large-tufted pincushion in English. It flowers between April and September. It is an endemic species that is restricted to the very south of the Western Cape province of South Africa.

== Description ==
The Mossel Bay pincushion is an upright, rounded shrub of 2–3 m (6–9 ft) high and up to 4 m (12 ft) in diameter that has a stout main stem of up to 8 cm (3.2 in) in diameter. The branches are covered by a smooth, grey bark. The flowering branches are round in cross-section, ½–1 cm (0.2–0.4 in) in diameter and covered in a dense, greyish layer of felty, cringy hairs pressed to the surface, with some long silky hairs. The leaves are hairless, inverted egg-shaped or broadly wedge-shaped, 3½–7 cm (1.4–2.8 in) long and 1½–3 cm (0.6–1.2 in) wide, with between six and eleven teeth near the tip, oriented slightly pointing upwards and somewhat overlapping.

The flower heads are seated in the axil of a leaf, globe-shaped, 6 cm (2.4 in) in diameter, with up to four head per flowering stem. The common base of the flowers in the same head is broadly cone-shaped, about 2 cm (0.8 in) high and 1½ cm (0.6 in) wide. It is subtended by an involucre consisting of oval bracts with a pointy tip of about 0.8 cm (0.32 in) long and ½ cm (0.2 in) wide, that are rubbery in consistency, and densely set with soft grey hairs. The bracts that subtend the individual flowers are inverted egg-shaped with a suddenly pointed tip, about 1 cm (0.4 in) long and ½ cm (0.2 in) wide, thickly woolly at its base and rubbery in consistency.

The perianth is about 3 cm (1.2 in) long, yellow in color when opening, but becoming orange when aging. The lower part with the lobes fused (called tube) is 6–8 mm (0.24–0.32 in) long, hairless and narrow at its base, but very finely powdery and ballooning higher up, to be suddenly narrowed again where the middle part of the perianth begins. The middle part where at least one of the lobes becomes free when the flower opens (called claws), is pale yellow in color, curves back near its upper end and is powdery hairy. The higher part of the lobes (called limbs) is narrowly lance-shaped, ½ cm (0.2 in) long, are covered by long soft silky hairs on the outside, carrying the almost seated anther. The style is initially pale yellow, but becomes orange when older, 3.8–4.8 cm (1.5–1.9 in) long and bending towards the centre of the head. The slightly thickened tip called pollen presenter is narrowly cone-shaped with a pointy tip and about 3 mm (0.12 in) long. Subtending the ovary are four opaque, rubbery, awl-shaped scales of about 3 mm long.

=== Differences with related species ===
L. praecox differs from its nearest relatives by the broadly cone-shaped base of the flower head (or receptacle), the inverted egg-shaped to broadly wedge-shaped leaves with six to eleven teeth near the tip, the finely powdery perianth, with its basal tube inflated, the 3.8–4.8 cm long style tipped by a narrowly cone-shaped pollen presenter with a pointy tip.

== Taxonomy ==
As far as we know, Alexander Prior was the first to collect a specimen of this species in 1847, and it is remarkable that it was not found during the 18th and early 19th century since this is a large and conspicuously flowering shrub, which is a relatively common species on the Albertinia limestone plateau. John Patrick Rourke described it in 1970 as Leucospermum praecox.

The species name praecox is a Latin word meaning "early flowering".

L. praecox is the type species of the section Tumiditubus.

== Distribution, habitat and ecology ==
L. praecox can be found in a relatively small area between Mossel Bay in the east to the mouth of the Gouritz River a little west of Albertinia and from the line between these locations southwards to the coast. Within this area it is locally common and there are several very dense stands, although an alien Hakea species is encroaching. At Mossel Bay L. praecox grows on weathered Table Mountain Sandstone, but elsewhere the species can only be found on deep stabilised white Tertiary to recently deposited, acidulous sands on the fore coast. L. praecox has an unusual flowering period, that begins in April, the southern hemisphere fall, until the early spring in September.

== Conservation ==
The Mossel Bay pincushion is considered vulnerable because it is under thread by alien Hakea species, habitat destruction by agricultural development and the growing and harvesting of large Restionaceae for thatching reeds. It is estimated that the population size has decreased by about 30% over the last decades.
