= Leucadendron galpinii =

Conservation status
- Endangered (IUCN 3.1)

Scientific classification
- Kingdom: Plantae
- Clade: Tracheophytes
- Clade: Angiosperms
- Clade: Eudicots
- Order: Proteales
- Family: Proteaceae
- Genus: Leucadendron
- Species: L. galpinii

Binomial name
- Leucadendron galpinii E.Phillips & Hutch. (1912)

Species of flowering plant

Leucadendron galpinii, the hairless conebush, is a flowering shrub in the family Proteaceae that is native to Africa.

== Phenology ==
The shrub grows to a height of 3 m and bears flowers from October to November. The species is dioecious, with separate male and female plants that are pollinated by insects. The seeds are held in a whorl on the female plant and survive wildfire, even though the plants do not, and are released to the ground, possibly to be dispersed by wind.

== Distribution and habitat ==
The species is endemic to the Western Cape of South Africa, where it occurs on the Riversdale plain from the De Hoop Nature Reserve to the Gourits River mouth. It forms part of the fynbos biome and grows mainly in sandy soils at altitudes of 0–200 m.

== Sources ==
- REDLIST Sanbi
- Biodiversityexplorer
- Protea Atlas
- Plants of the World Online
