= Leucadendron muirii =

Conservation status
- Near Threatened (IUCN 3.1)

Scientific classification
- Kingdom: Plantae
- Clade: Tracheophytes
- Clade: Angiosperms
- Clade: Eudicots
- Order: Proteales
- Family: Proteaceae
- Genus: Leucadendron
- Species: L. muirii

Binomial name
- Leucadendron muirii E.Phillips

Species of plant

Leucadendron muirii, the silver-ball conebush, is a flower-bearing shrub that belongs to the genus Leucadendron and forms part of the fynbos. The plant is native to the Western Cape, where it is found on the Elim, Bredasdorp and Riversdale plains. The shrub grows to 2.0 m in height and bears flowers from November to December.

Fire destroys the plant but the seeds survive. The seeds are stored in a toll on the female plant and are released after a fire and possibly spread by the wind. The plant is unisexual and there are male and female plants that reproduce through the activities of small towers. The plant grows in limestone soil at elevations of 0–200 m.

In Afrikaans it is known as kruiphout.
