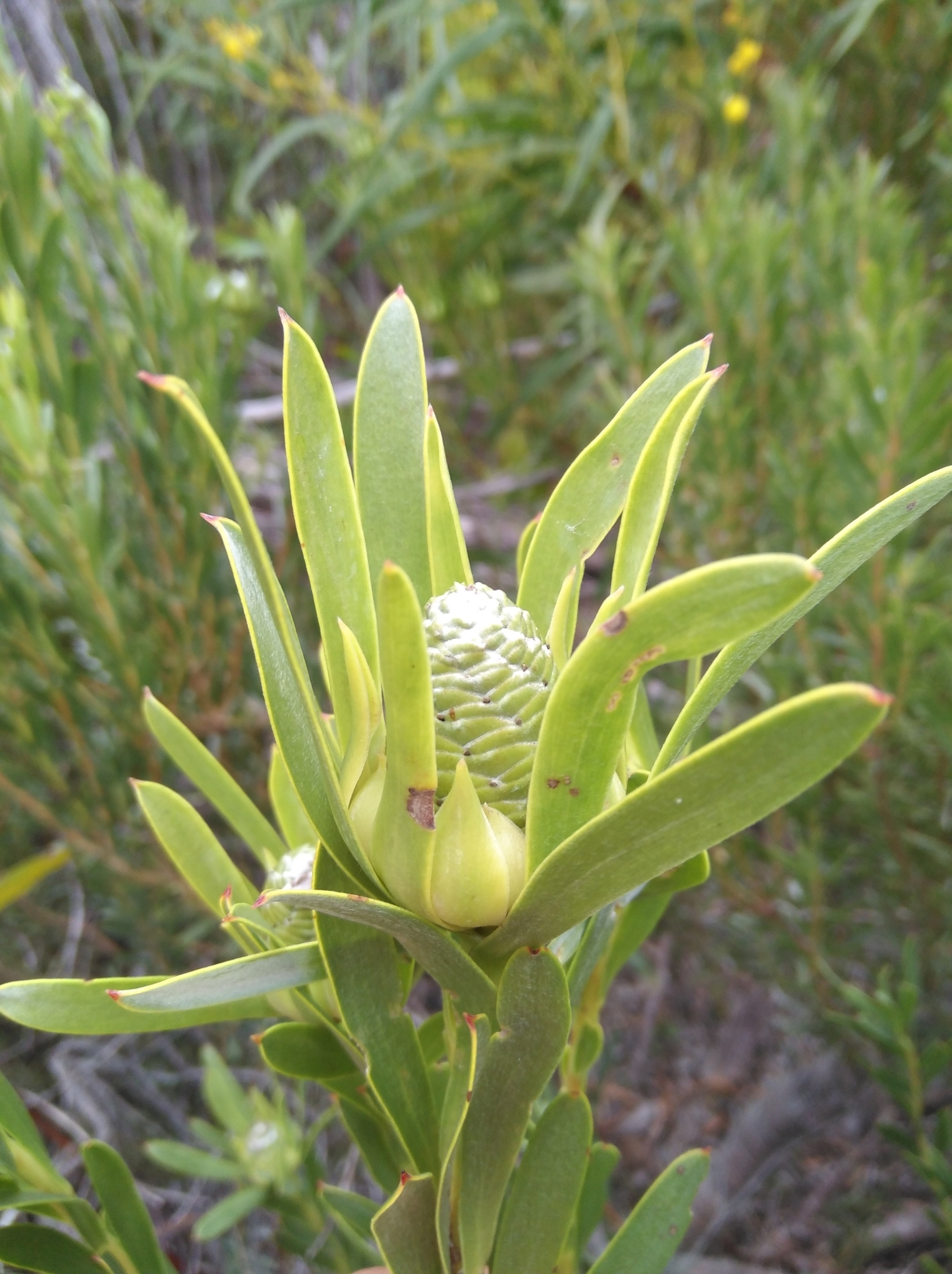

Conservation status
- Near Threatened (IUCN 3.1)

Scientific classification
- Kingdom: Plantae
- Clade: Tracheophytes
- Clade: Angiosperms
- Clade: Eudicots
- Order: Proteales
- Family: Proteaceae
- Genus: Leucadendron
- Species: L. meridianum

Binomial name
- Leucadendron meridianum I.Williams

= Leucadendron meridianum =

Species of flowering plant

Leucadendron meridianum, the limestone conebush, is a flower-bearing shrub belonging to the genus Leucadendron and forms part of the fynbos. The plant is native to the Western Cape, South Africa.

== Description ==
The shrub grows 2.0 m (6.6 ft) tall and flowers in June. The plant dies in a fire but the seeds survive. The seeds are stored in a toll on the female plant and fall to the ground after a fire and are spread by the wind, the seeds have wings. The plant is unisexual and there are separate plants with male and female flowers, which are pollinated by small beetles.

In Afrikaans, it is known as astolbos.

== Distribution and habitat ==
The plant occurs from the Cape Peninsula to Potberg and Riviersonderend in South Africa. The plant grows mainly in sandy soil at altitudes of 0–1,000 m (0–3,281 ft).
