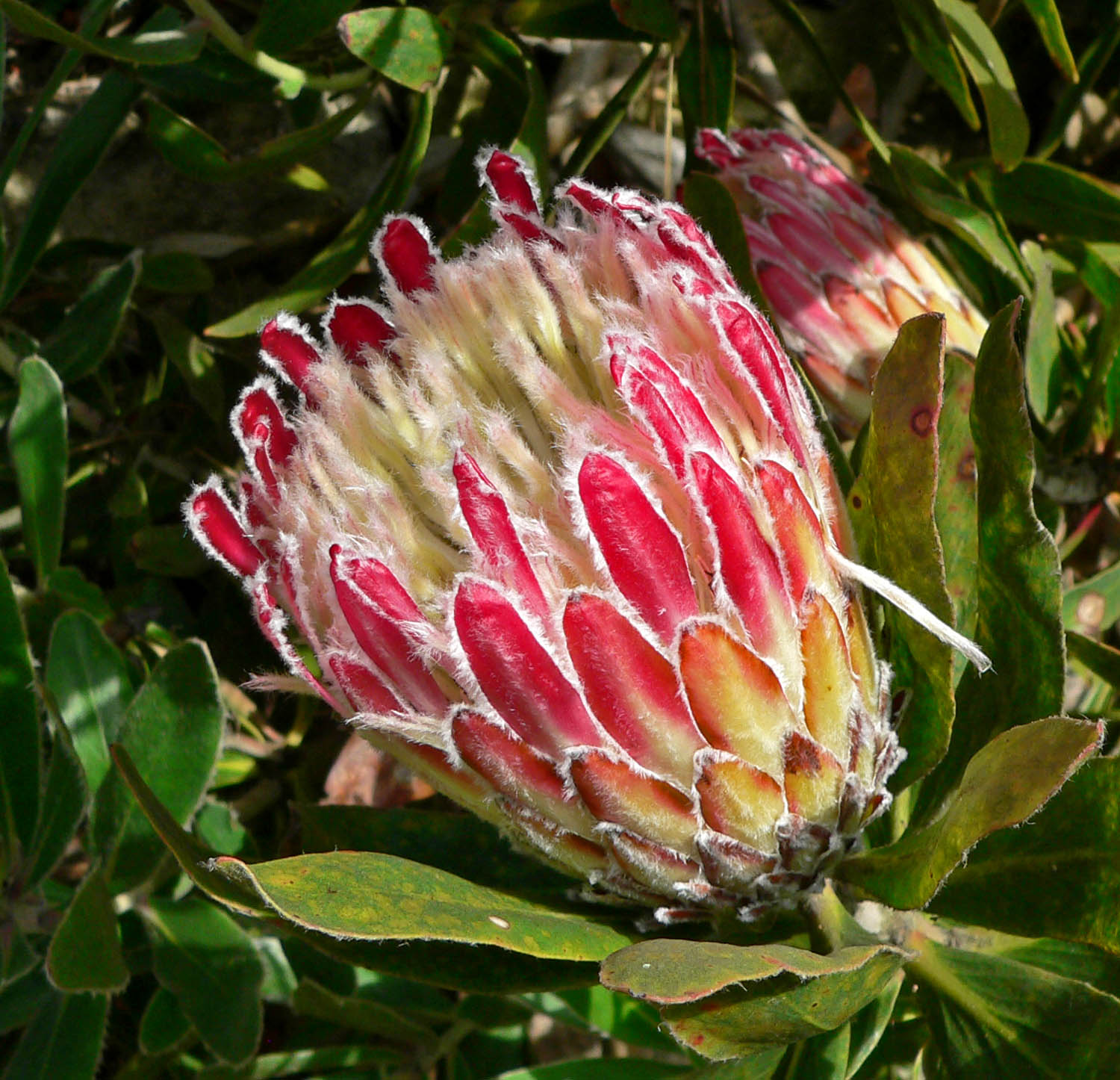
- Protea obtusifolia 'Holiday Red'

Conservation status
- Near Threatened (IUCN 3.1)

Scientific classification
- Kingdom: Plantae
- Clade: Embryophytes
- Clade: Tracheophytes
- Clade: Angiosperms
- Clade: Eudicots
- Order: Proteales
- Family: Proteaceae
- Genus: Protea
- Species: P. obtusifolia

Binomial name
- Protea obtusifolia H. Buek ex Meisn.

= Protea obtusifolia =

Species of flowering plant

Protea obtusifolia is a species of Protea. It is native to the Cape Provinces of South Africa.
