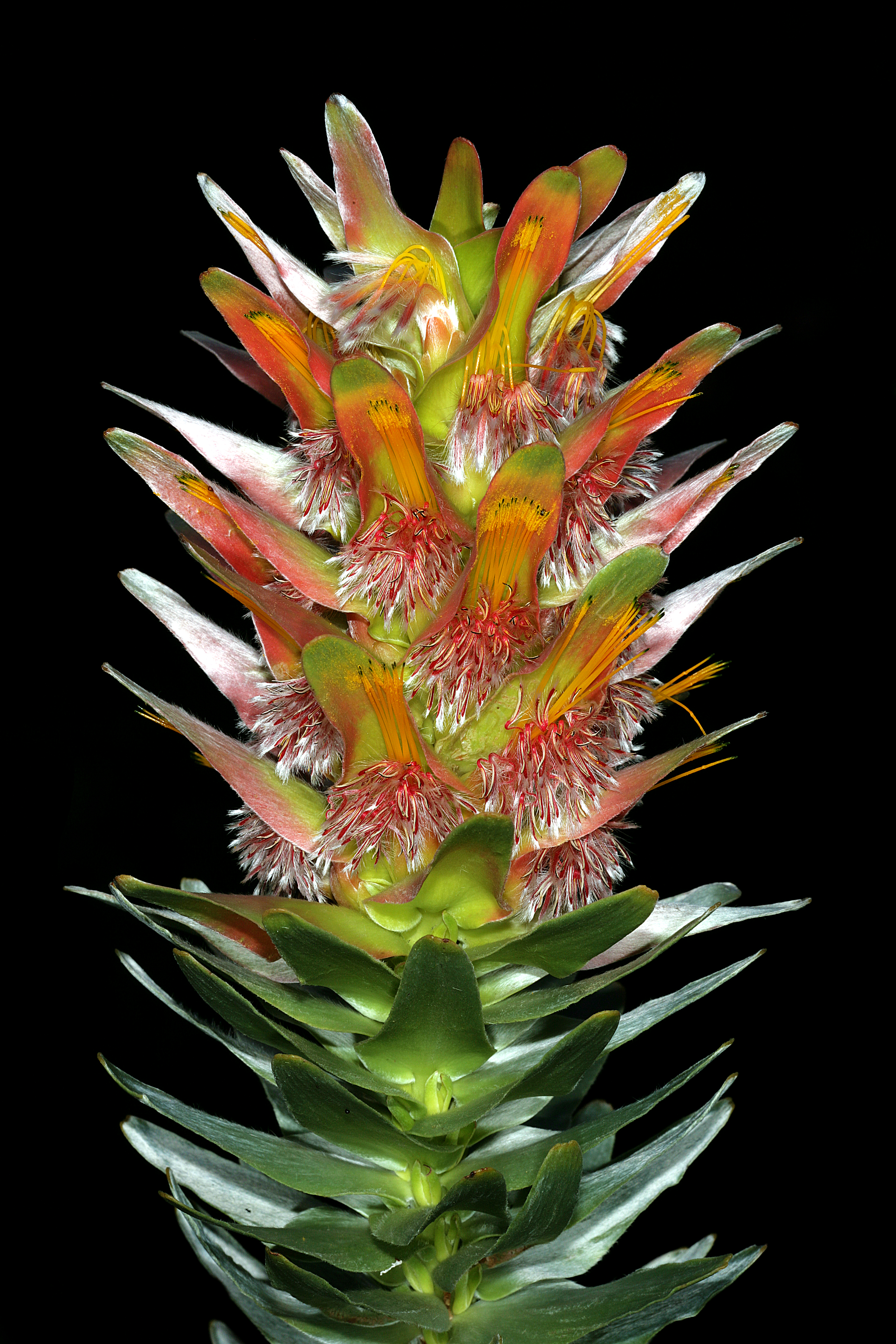

Conservation status
- Endangered (IUCN 3.1)

Scientific classification
- Kingdom: Plantae
- Clade: Tracheophytes
- Clade: Angiosperms
- Clade: Eudicots
- Order: Proteales
- Family: Proteaceae
- Genus: Mimetes
- Species: M. splendidus

Binomial name
- Mimetes splendidus Salisb. ex Knight

Synonyms
- Mimetes hibbertii, Protea hibbertii; Mimetes integrus; Mimetes mundii

= Mimetes splendidus =

Species of plant endemic to South Africa

Mimetes splendidus or splendid pagoda is an evergreen, rather sparsely branching, upright shrub of up to 2.5 m (8 ft) high from the family Proteaceae. It has broadly lance-shaped to oval, silvery-hairy leaves with three or four teeth crowded at the tip. It has cylinder-shaped inflorescences that consists of many heads, each containing eleven to thirteen flowers, in the axils of the highest leaves. These leaves form a hood over a lower flowerhead and are flushed orangy pink. It flowers during winter, from early May to September. It is an endemic species that is restricted to the south face of the coastal mountains of the Western Cape province of South Africa.

== Description ==
Mimetes splendidus is an evergreen, rather sparsely branching, upright shrub of up to 2.5 m (8 ft) high, which develops from a single trunk of up to 6 cm (2.5 in) thick that is covered by a thin, grey bark with a smooth surface except for the horizontal striping. In older specimens, the lower stems have lost their leaves. Young branches are stiffly upright, seldom branching, silky hairy and 6–10 mm (0.24–0.40 in) thick, later tilting over. The leaves are set alternately along the branches, at an upward angle and overlapping. They lack both stipules and leaf stalks, are broadly lance-shaped or elliptic, 4–5.5 cm (1.6–2.2 in) long and 1.8–2.5 cm (0.5–1 in) wide, are silvery in colour due to a dense covering of silky hairs, with more or less pointy tips, often with three or four reddish or amber-coloured, thickened teeth closely cropped.

The inflorescence is broadly cylinder-shaped, 8–12 cm (3.3–4.8 in) long and 6–8 cm (2.3–3.3 in) in diameter, topped by smallish, more or less flattened, silvery-pink leaves. In the axils of the leaves just below the crest are flower heads each containing ten to fourteen flowers, the subtending leaves with ears at its base, forming a hood over the underlying flower head, that is flushed in a brilliant orangy pink when flowering. The bracts that encircle the flower heads are broadly oval to inverted egg-shaped or tending to rectangular with a blunt tip, a hairless or powdery hairy surface and a fringe of hairs along its margin, papery when dry, warm yellow or amber-coloured when fresh, the margins curving inwards and enveloping the base of the flowers, 1.3–1.8 cm (0.5–0.7 in) long and 0.7–1 cm (0.12–0.24 in) wide, the inner whorl lance-shaped to narrowly lance-shaped, with a sharply pointy tip, 1.5–4 cm (0.7–1.8 in) long and ¾–1 cm (0.28–0.40 in) wide.

The bract subtending the individual flower is line-shaped, 12–16 mm (0.48–0.64 in) long, about 2 mm (0.08 in) wide, and densely silky hairy. The 4-merous perianth is 3–3.5 cm (1.2–1.4 in) long. The lower part, that remains merged when the flower is open, is slightly inflated, hairless, and about 3–4 mm (0.12–0.16 in) long. The segments in the middle part (or claws), are thread-shaped and silky hairy. The segments in the upper part (or limbs), which enclosed the pollen presenter in the bud, are boat-shaped, line-shaped with a pointy tip in outline, 8–10 mm (0.32–0.40 in) long, covered in dense silky hairs, and a tuft of stiff hairs at its tip. From the centre of the perianth emerges the style of 4.5–5.5 cm (1.8–2.2 in) long, straight and thread-shaped. The thickened part at the tip of the style called pollen presenter is 5–7 mm (0.2–0.3 in) long, line-shaped with a pointy tip and a thickened ring at the base. The sigmatic groove sits obliquely across the very tip. The egg-shaped ovary is silky hairy and about 1 mm long (0.04 in). It is subtended by four bright orange, fleshy, awl- to line-shaped scales of about 2 mm (0.08 in) long. The fruit is narrowly oval in shape, 6–7 mm (0.24–0.28 in) long and 4–5 mm (0.16–0.20 in) in diameter.

=== Differences with related species ===
The splendid pagoda is one of a group with silvery leaves due to a dense covering of silky hairs, the others being M. arboreus, M. argenteus, M. hottentoticus and M. stokoei. From the other species in this group it can be distinguished by its leaves that almost fully consistently have three or four teeth near their tips. In addition, the involucral bracts that surround the individual flower heads are oblong with a rounded tip, nearly hairless on the outer surface, amber-coloured and thin when fresh (papery and brown in herbarium specimens).

== Taxonomy ==
Richard Anthony Salisbury first described the splendid pagoda in 1809 and called it Mimetes splendidus. He did so in a book that contained an extensive revision of the Proteaceae, titled On the cultivation of the plants belonging to the natural order of Proteeae, published by Joseph Knight. Salisbury however, reputedly had seen the draft of a paper called On the natural order of plants called Proteaceae that Robert Brown was to publish in 1810. Brown called the species M. hibbertii. In 1816, Jean Louis Marie Poiret, who collapsed several Proteaceae genera, reassigned it and called it Protea hibbertii. John Hutchinson, a South African botanist, described a comparable specimen collected by Zeyher, which he called M. integrus In 1912. The herbarium sheet on which it is based, not only contains a branch of the splendid pagoda, but also of the silver pagoda (M. argenteus), and has caused considerable confusion. Finally, Christian Friedrich Ecklon described a further specimen, naming it M. mundii. In 1984, John Patrick Rourke considered all of these specimens representatives of the same species, rendering all other names synonyms of M. splendidus.

== Distribution, habitat and ecology ==
The splendid pagoda is an uncommon species that mostly occurs as single individuals or small groups. It has a rather large distribution, which naturally occurs from the Clock Peaks in the westend of the Langeberg near Swellendam in the west, via the Outeniqua Mountains to Rondebos in the Tsitsikamma National Park in the east, a narrow, 300 km long strip. It is restricted to sloping terrain with a southern or southeastern exposure and a consistently high water availability. It grows on moist, acidulous, peaty soils always above 600 m (2000 ft) and mostly 1000–1200 m (3250–4000 ft) in a dense fynbos vegetation of mostly over 2 m (7 ft) high. Plants usually live for about twenty years. Flowering occurs during winter until September, peaking in May and June. The fruits are usually shed in January and February. As usual for pagodas, the flowers are pollinated by birds. The fruits are gathered by native ants that carry them to their underground nests. Here, the seeds remain dormant until the overhead vegetation is removed by an overhead fire and the seeds germinate in response to increased daily temperature fluctuations and washed-down charcoal chemicals. Adult plants of this species do not survive such fires.

== Conservation ==
The splendid pagoda is considered an endangered species due to its declining population size, its small subpopulation, and its threats of competition by invasive species, afforestation and too frequent fires.
