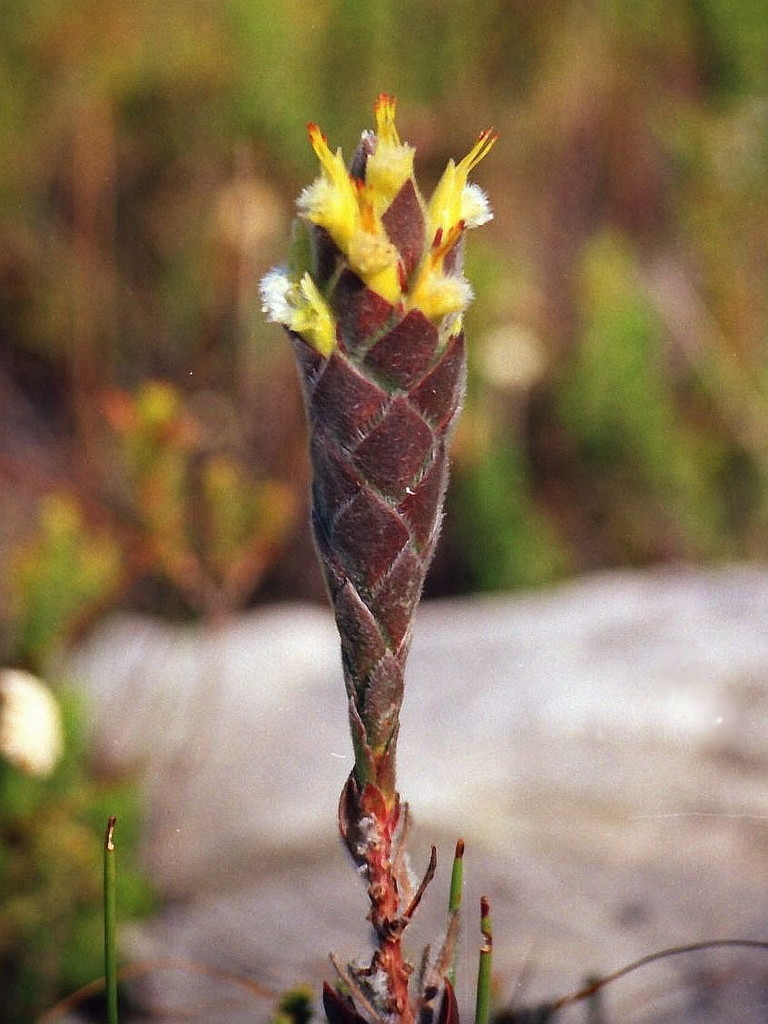
- At Kleinrivier Mountains, Western Cape

Conservation status
- Endangered (IUCN 3.1)

Scientific classification
- Kingdom: Plantae
- Clade: Tracheophytes
- Clade: Angiosperms
- Clade: Eudicots
- Order: Proteales
- Family: Proteaceae
- Genus: Mimetes
- Species: M. palustris

Binomial name
- Mimetes palustris E.Phillips

Synonyms
- Mimetes decapitatus

= Mimetes palustris =

Species of plant endemic to South Africa

Mimetes palustris or cryptic pagoda is an evergreen shrub, assigned to the family Proteaceae. It has horizontal sprawling shoots as well as upright, unbranched shoots usually about ½ m (1½ in) high. The leaves are entire and stand out on the lower parts of the shoots, but are overlapping and pressed tightly against each other near the inflorescence, almost like a snakeskin. The inflorescence consists of several flowerheads, each containing three clear yellow flowers that are longer than the subtending leaves. It is the smallest species of Mimetes and is an endemic species that grows on well-drained, but permanently moist sandy and peaty slopes in the mountains near Hermanus, Western Cape province of South Africa. It is considered critically endangered. Flowering occurs all year round, but peaks in August and September.

== Description ==
Mimetes palustris is an evergreen shrub, of mostly about ½ m (1½ ft), seldom 1 m high, and up to ¾ m (2½ ft) in diameter, that develops from an upright main stem of up to ½ cm (0.2 in) thick, which is covered by brown bark. At 5–10 cm (2–4 in) above the ground, several vigorous, upright, unbranched shoots emerge, as well as many lax horizontal runners that occasionally fork. Both types of shoot are 1½–3 mm (0.06–0.12 in) thick, initially covert in rusty-coloured felty hairs, but becoming hairless with age. The leathery leaves are alternately set and lack both stipules and a leaf stalk, are lance-shaped, elliptic to very broadly oval near the inflorescences, 1½–2 cm (0.6–0.8 in) long and ½–1 cm (0.2–0.4 in) wide, and have a pointy, thickened tip. The leaves are initially densely covered in rusty-coloured felty hairs and have a fringe of felty hair, but become hairless with age. Near the foot of the shoots the leaves stand out horizontally, but near the inflorescences the leaves are overlapping and tightly clasp the stem.

On some of the runners, inflorescences develop that consist of one to three flower heads at its tip. The erect shoots have inflorescences of five to twelve heads and are narrowly cylinder-shaped. The flower heads are 3½ cm (1.4 in) long and consist of three to six flowers, and are subtended by an ordinary green leaf. The outer whorl of bracts that encircle the flower heads are green and leafy in texture, line- to lance-shaped, 1½–2 cm (0.6–0.8 in) long and 2–4 mm (0.08–0.16 in) wide. The bracts on the inside of the head are papery in consistency and carry some silky hairs on the outer surface, are narrowly lance-shaped to elliptic lance-shaped with a sharply pointed tip, 2–3 cm (0.8–1.2 in) long and 4–10 mm (0.16–0.40 in) wide.

The bract that subtends the individual flower is line-shaped or narrowly lance-shaped, about 1 cm (0.4 in) long and covered in dense silky hairs. The 4-merous perianth is 2–2½ cm (0.8–1.0 in) long. The lower part called tube, that remains merged when the flower is open, is 2–3 mm (0.08–0.12 in) long, square in cross-section, and hairless. The four segments in the middle part (or claws), are thread-shaped and silky hairy. The segments in the upper part (or limbs), which enclosed the pollen presenter in the bud, are difficult to distinguish from the claws, threat- to line-shaped with a pointy tip, initially felty, but later losing some hair. The four anthers are about 2 mm (0.08 in) long, lack a filament and are directly connected to the limbs. From the centre of the perianth emerges a style of about 3½ cm (1.4 in) long, that is straight and slightly curves outward. The thickened part at the tip of the style called pollen presenter is line-shaped with a pointy tip, about 2 mm long, with ring at its base and a narrower neck. The 1–2 mm (0.04–0.08 in) long ovary is egg-shaped, powdery hairy except the zone facing the stem, and is subtended by four pointy, awl- to line-shaped scales of about 1 mm (0.04 in) long.

=== Differences with related species ===
The cryptic pagoda can be distinguished from other Mimetes species by its small size, the two types of shoots, one unbranched upright, the other occasionally forking and sprawling, the leaves that stand out on the lower parts but are very tightly overlapping near the inflorescence and the relatively short (3½ cm), straight, line- to awl-shaped styles. The flower heads only have three to six flowers, the least of any Mimetes, except for the three-flowered pagoda, which has orange flowers, not yellow.

== Taxonomy ==
As far as known, the cryptic pagoda was first collected by James Niven. Richard Anthony Salisbury in a book by Joseph Knight titled On the cultivation of the plants belonging to the natural order of Proteeae, described several species of pagoda, naming Niven's specimen M. palustris in 1809. Karl Ludwig Philipp Zeyher collected a specimen in the Kleinrivier Mountains, that was described by Carl Meissner, in 1856, in the series Prodromus Systematis Naturalis Regni Vegetabilis by Alphonse Pyramus de Candolle. He called it M. decapitata. John Patrick Rourke in 1984 regarded the specimens as belonging to the same species.

== Distribution and habitat ==
Mimetes palustris is an endemic species restricted to the Kleinrivier Mountains, Western Cape province of South Africa, where it can be found between the Platberg in the Fernkloof Nature Reserve near Hermanus in the west and slightly east of the Rocklands Peak. Here it grows in a vegetation type called Overberg Sandstone Fynbos, at an altitude of 600–900 m (2000–3000 ft).

Mimetes palustris can only be found on south-facing slopes in part-shade in locations where an updraught from the sea create cool and moist air during summer. At the edge of seepage zones it can be found in combination with Brunia alopecuroides, Erica hispidula, Roridula gorgonias, and Villarsia ovata. Flower heads may occur at any time during the year. It is assumed that like other Mimetes species, the cryptic pagoda is pollinated by birds and the seeds are distributed by ants.

== Conservation ==
The cryptic pagoda is considered critically endangered due to its diminishing population size, its small distribution area of 26 km^{2} (10 sq mi), ongoing loss of habitat and competition by alien invasive species. Too frequent fires may deplete the soil seed bank and so reduce the number of germinating seeds.
