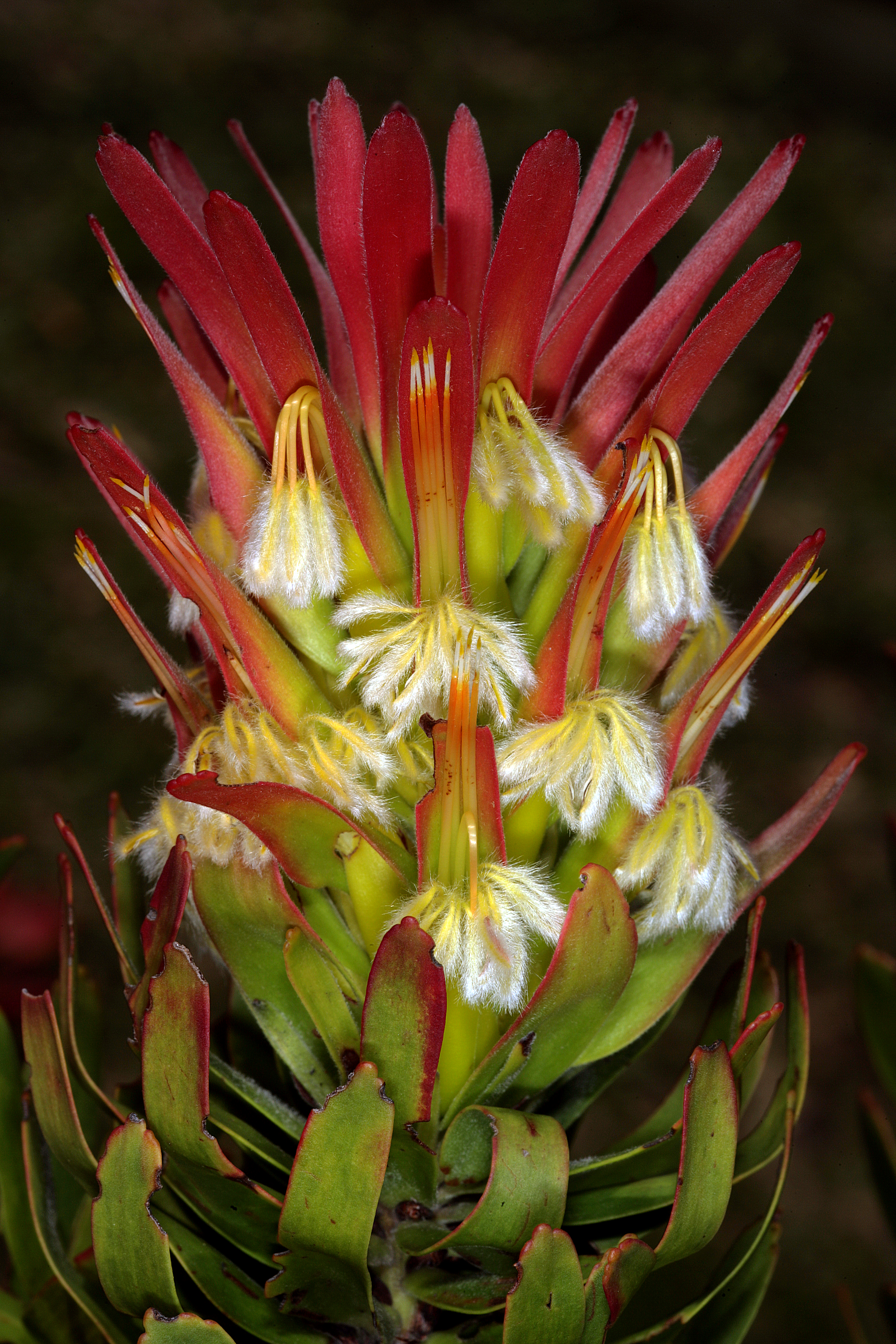
- Mimetes cucullatus

Scientific classification
- Kingdom: Plantae
- Clade: Tracheophytes
- Clade: Angiosperms
- Clade: Eudicots
- Order: Proteales
- Family: Proteaceae
- Subfamily: Proteoideae
- Tribe: Leucadendreae
- Subtribe: Leucadendrinae
- Genus: Mimetes; Salisb.

Synonyms
- Mimetes sect. Eumimetes

= Mimetes =

Genus of shrubs from South Africa

Mimetes, the pagoda, is a genus of evergreen shrubs or small trees 0.5–6 m (1.6–19.7 ft) high, with thirteen species assigned to the family Proteaceae. This genus, as with other proteas, is popular with nectarivorous birds such as the Cape sugarbird and several sunbird species. All species of Mimetes are endemic to the Cape Floristic Region of South Africa.

== Description ==
The thirteen species currently assigned to the genus Mimetes are evergreen, low shrubs to small trees of 0.5–6 m (1.6–20 ft) high. Its leaves lack stipules, are set alternately along the branches, without a leaf stalk, at an upward angle or more or less overlapping, long inverted egg-shaped, oval or long diamond-shaped, 1.5–8.25 cm (0.6–3.2 in) long and 0.5–4 cm (0.2–1.6 in) wide, with an entire margin, thickened at the tip and often with mostly three teeth clustered close together. After the flower heads in the axils of the leaves have been shed, the dormant growing tip is activated and produces the next inflorescence.

It has twelve homologous sets of chromosomes (2n=24).

=== Inflorescence and flower heads ===
The flower heads are grouped in cylindric aggregations in the axils of the higher leaves of the stems. The bracts that subtend each flower head are either small and woody, or enlarged, bright in colour, papery or fleshy. The individual flower heads contain three to thirty-five flowers, relatively few compared to many other Proteaceae genera. This, and the sometimes bright coloration of the leaves and bracts in the inflorescence, result in the flower head functioning more or less as a single flower.

Three types of flower head are distinguished: brush, tube and gullet. The flower heads of most species are of the brush-type. Flower heads of the brush-type have large perianths, pollen presenters and often bracts in bright and contrasting yellow, white or red. The subtending leaves do not differ from other leaves and remain green throughout flowering.

In the tube-type flower heads, that only occurs in M. pauciflora, the number of flowers per head is reduced down to three (rarely four), and the involucral bracts are short. The bright yellow bracteoles of the three flowers together form a long, straight and narrow tube, from which only the perianth limbs and pollen presenters extend. The tube-type flower head functions comparable to tube-shaped corollas, such as in the large-flowered Erica species.

The gullet-type flower head uniquely occurs in M. cucullatus and M. fimbriifolius. It functions in the same way as Acanthus and many Scrophulariaceae and Lamiaceae flowers. The bracts at the side of the stem are smaller, those in sight from the side are enlarged, while the leaf that is subtending the flower head above forms a brightly coloured hood. When the flowers open, the styles grow longer, break free from the perianth, and are pressed in the overhead leaf.

=== Flower ===
The individual flowers are 4-merous, star-symmetrical, and contain both male and female organs. The perianth is cylinder-shaped in the bud. The lower part, where the lobes remain merged when the flower has opened (called tube), is mostly becoming hairless, very short, circular to somewhat square in cross section or inflated. In the middle part (or claws) where the perianth is split lengthwise, the lobes are thread-shaped and softly hairy. In the upper part (or limbs), which enclosed the pollen presenter in the bud, the four lobes are line-shaped, pointy or pointed, continue to be softly hairy or becoming hairless. The anthers are line-shaped with a pointy tip, directly merged with the base of the limbs without a filament.

From the perianth emerges a style that is circular in cross section, curved when breaking open the bud, but eventually straight. The slightly thickened part at the tip of the style called pollen presenter is line-shaped, with a pointy of pointed tip, cylinder-shaped, egg-shaped or head-shaped, with a ring distinguishing its base from the style. The ovary is slender, softly hairy and contains one pendulous ovule, it is difficult to determine where it merges into the style. It is subtended by four blunt or line- to thread-shaped scales.

== Taxonomy ==
In 1807, Richard Anthony Salisbury in his contribution to William Hooker's book The Paradisus Londinensis, divided Leucadendron, as defined by Carl Linnaeus and that contained rather divers forms, over several new genera and erected, amongst others, the genus Mimetes.

Two years later Salisbury assigned five species to Mimetes in a book by Joseph Knight titled On the cultivation of the plants belonging to the natural order of Proteeae, M. fimbriifolius, M. splendidus, M. argenteus, M. hirtus and M. palustris. In 1810, Robert Brown in his review called On the natural order of plants called Proteaceae newly described M. pauciflorus, M. capitulatus, and reassigned Leucadendron cucullatum, creating the new combination M. cucullatus. He also collapsed Salisbury's genus Diastella into Mimetes.

Carl Meissner, who contributed a section on the Proteaceae in 1856 to the series Prodromus Systematis Naturalis Regni Vegetabilis by Alphonse Pyramus de Candolle, integrated both Diastella and Orothamnus as the sections Pseudomimetes and Orothamnus, and assigning Mimetes as defined by Salisbury to the section Eumimetes.

In 1911, Edwin Percy Phillips described M. saxatilis. Phillips and John Hutchinson disagreed with Brown and Meissner, and in 1912 returned to Salisbury's delimitation, restoring both Diastella and Orothamnus. Phillips described M. stokoei in 1922 and M. hottentoticus in 1923.

In 1982, John Patrick Rourke described M. arboreus, and finally in 1988 M. chrysanthus.

=== Phylogeny ===
Comparison of homologous DNA has increased the insight in the phylogenetic relationships between the Proteaceae. It shows that Mimetes belongs to a group that further only consists of genera endemic to the Cape Floristic Region, that together constitute the subtribe Leucadendrinae. There is doubt whether Mimetes is monophyletic, since a study that looked at few genes, and included five of the species of Mimetes, two of Diastella and Orothamnus zeyheri, indicates that some Mimetes species may be more related to these two genera than to other Mimetes species. Leucospermum is most related to the Mimetes-group. A subgroup of Paranomus, Vexatorella, Sorocephalus and Spatalla is the sister group to the Leucospermum-Mimetes subgroup. The following tree represent those insights.

- subtribe Leucadendrinae
  - Leucadendron
  - - - - Leucospermum
        - Mimetes, Diastella and Orothamnus
      - - - Vexatorella
          - Paranomus
        - - Sorocephalus
          - Spatalla
    - Serruria

=== Naming ===
The genus name Mimetes (Μιμητές) is Ancient Greek and means "imitators", because its leaves are similar to those of several other genera. The word is masculine in Greek and Salisbury conjugated the species names accordingly. Robert Brown, and Phillips and Hutchinson made feminine epithets. Rourke in 1984 agreed with Salisbury. The species are called pagoda for their tiered compound inflorescences in English, and stompie (small stump) probably for the charcoaled remains sticking out of the ground after a fire in Afrikaans.

== Species ==
13 species are currently recognised by Plants of the World Online.

Common and scientific names	Distribution	IUCN status and population estimate	SANBI status	Image
Kogelberg pagoda Mimetes arboreus Rourke	Kogelberg Mountain Ranges	800–1,000	Endangered	
Silver pagoda Mimetes argenteus Salisb. ex Knight	Hottentots Holland, Franschhoek and Riviersonderend Mountains	350–640	Endangered	
Conical pagoda Mimetes capitulatus R.Br.	Kogelberg, Kleinrivier and Groenland Mountains	3,000–5,000	Vulnerable	
Golden pagoda Mimetes chrysanthus Rourke	Gamka and Perdeberg mountains	1,001–25,823	Vulnerable	
Common pagoda Mimetes cucullatus (L.) R.Br.	Western Cape	124,742–6,030,394	Least concern	
Fringed pagoda, Tree pagoda Mimetes fimbriifolius Salisb. ex Knight	Cape Peninsula	7,615–468,358	Rare	
Marsh pagoda Mimetes hirtus Salisb. ex Knight	Cape Peninsula and Elim	4,488–130,836	Vulnerable	
Silver pagoda, Matchstick pagoda Mimetes hottentoticus E.Phillips & Hutch.	Kogelberg Mountain	279–2,000	Vulnerable	
Cryptic pagoda Mimetes palustris Salisb. ex Knight	Kleinrivier Mountains	217–5,000	Endangered	
Three-flowered pagoda Mimetes pauciflorus R.Br.	Outeniqua and Tsitsikamma Mountains	14,594–243,116	Near threatened	
Limestone pagoda Mimetes saxatilis E.Phillips	Coastal Western Cape Province	1,528–135,377	Endangered	
Splendid pagoda Mimetes splendidus Salisb. ex Knight	Langeberg and Tsitsikamma Mountains	250–350	Endangered	
Mace pagoda Mimetes stokoei E.Phillips	Palmiet River Mountains	7–34	Critically endangered	

=== Hybrids ===
Hybrids are known between M. cucullatus and M. fimbriifolius from the Cape Peninsula on locations where both parents grow side by side. Intermediate in most characters, the general habitat is mostly like that of M. cucullatus, but the lowest part of the stems is stout, and the bark is thick and cartilaginous like that of M. fimbriifolius. A hybrid of M. capitulatus and M. hirtus was collected once, and specimens made from cuttings have since been grown at Kirstenbosch.

=== Reassigned species ===
The name Mimetes purpureus is a synonym of Diastella proteoides.

=== Unassigned names ===
The herbarium specimen collected by Francis Masson, which was described by Salisbury in 1809 and named Mimetes floccosa, could not be traced, and its description is so general that it could apply to several other species. So the identity of this name cannot be established.

== Distribution ==
The genus Mimetes has a distribution not unlike other endemic genera in the Cape Floristic Region, with the highest species concentration in the wet mountains in the southwest, centered around the Kogelberg Nature Reserve. The genus can be found from near Porterville in the north and the Cape Peninsula in the southwest, to Formosa Peak in the east. There are three isolated inland populations of M. cucullatus in the Kouga Mountains, Klein Swartberg and Rooiberg, an isolated mountain in the middle of the Little Karoo. This makes it likely that its distribution used to be larger than today but, with increasing drought, it became limited to areas that are wet enough today. Its close relative M. fimbriifolius is restricted to the surroundings of Table Mountain and the Cape Peninsula. M. saxatilis occurs in an approximately 100 km (63 mi) long, narrow strip along the south coast between Franskraal in the west and Struisbay, several km east of Cape Agulhas, and from there in a narrow strip inland to around Bredasdorp. M. splendidus is a rare species that nevertheless has a relatively large distribution, in the coastal mountains that parallel the south coast between the Clock Peaks near Swellendam in the west and Rondebos near Storms River in the east. M. argenteus can be found between Sir Lowry's Pass near Gordon's Bay through the southeastern slopes of the Hottentots Holland Mountains, along the south face of the Riviersonderend Mountains eastwards to Appelskraal. Its close relative, M. arboreus occupies a rather restricted area in and around the Kogelberg Nature Reserve, from the Steenbras Ridge and the slopes of the Kogelberg south to the mountains above Betty's Bay. M. hottentoticus has an even more restricted distribution, but also in the Kogelberg area, on the higher southeastern face of the Kogelberg Peak and in the northwestern part of the Groenland mountains. M. stokoei is known from the Kogelberg Nature Reserve, somewhat more easterly, on the Paardeberg adjacent to the Palmiet River near Kleinmond. M. hirtus occurs on the Cape Peninsula, in lower southern slopes of the Kogelberg Nature Reserve above Pringle Bay, Betty's Bay, Kleinmond, along the mouth of the Bot River and above Hermanus, with an easterly outlier in the hills surrounding Elim. Populations west of False Bay between Silvermine and Rondebosch have disappeared. M. pauciflorus is present on the south facing slopes of the coastal mountains along the south coast, between the Ruitersberg, north of Mossel Bay in the Western Cape to slightly beyond Formosa Peak in the Eastern Cape. M. capitulatus is a rare species that occurs in and around the Kogelberg Nature Reserve, particularly on the Paardeberg, the Groenlandberg and the Kogelberg Peak, whereas earlier sightings from the Kleinrivier Mountains could not be confirmed more recently.

== Ecology ==
Mimetes species are pollinated by birds, most frequently the orange-breasted sunbird, Nectarinia violacea, but also malachite sunbird, Nectarinia famosa, and lesser double-collared sunbird, Nectarinia chalybea. Fruits are usually released in the late afternoon, precisely the time of day when ants are most active. This has great survival value because fresh elaiosomes are more attractive to ants.

== Conservation ==
All thirteen currently described species are listed on the IUCN Red List of Threatened Species and the Red List of South African Plants published by the South African National Biodiversity Institute (SAMBI) at the national level. Both organisations regard M. cucullatus as being least concern and M. pauciflorus as near threatened. 10 species are listed as threatened, with M. capitulatus,M. chrysanthus, M. hirtus and M. hottentoticus being listed as vulnerable, M. arboreus, M. argenteus, M. palustris, M. saxatilis and M. splendens as endangered species and M. stokoei as critically endangered.

While the IUCN lists M. fimbriifolius as least concern, SAMBI lists it as rare, which is the IUCN equivalent of least concern, but meets one of four national criteria involving a restricted range, highly specific habitat, low population density or a population estimate of less than 10,000 mature individuals.

M. stokoei was initially known from two locations close to one another with each up to a dozen or so plants. It was thought to have gone extinct as careful searches between 1950 and 1966 did not succeed, when one young plant was found. This plant however died without having flowered in that same year. Again, it could not be traced between 1967 and 2001, but again it was rediscovered, after seeds in the ground germinated following a fire and subsequent rains.
