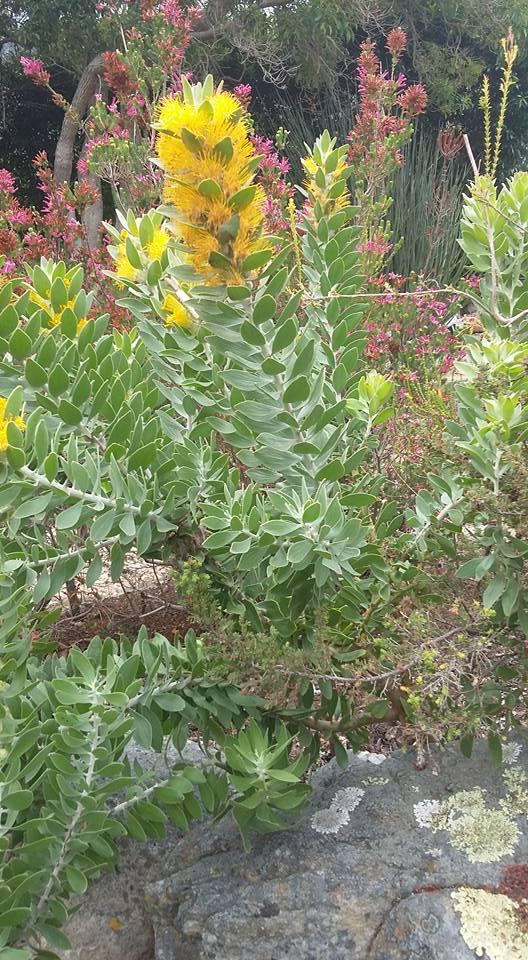

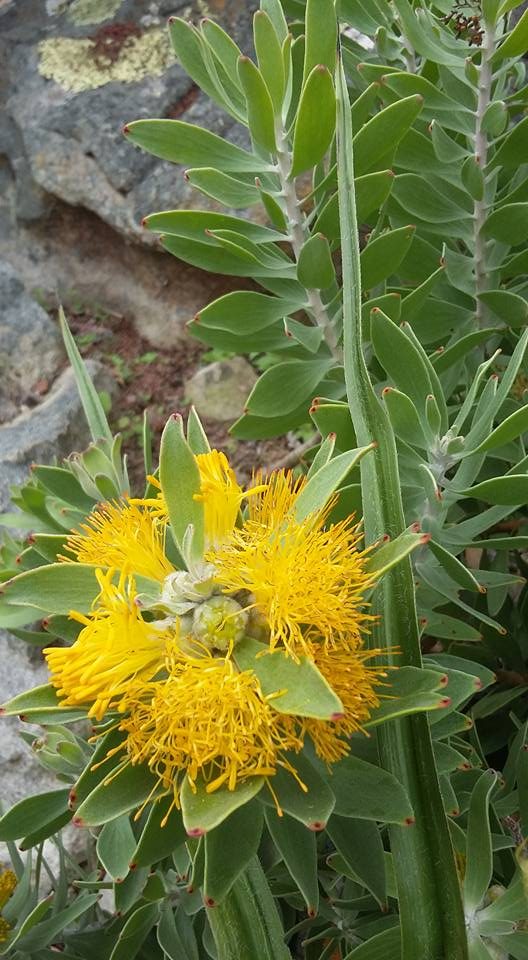

Conservation status
- Vulnerable (IUCN 3.1)

Scientific classification
- Kingdom: Plantae
- Clade: Tracheophytes
- Clade: Angiosperms
- Clade: Eudicots
- Order: Proteales
- Family: Proteaceae
- Genus: Mimetes
- Species: M. chrysanthus

Binomial name
- Mimetes chrysanthus Rourke

= Mimetes chrysanthus =

Species of plant endemic to South Africa

Mimetes chrysanthus (also called golden pagoda) is an evergreen, upright shrub of 1½–2 m (5–6½ ft) high that has been assigned to the family Proteaceae. It has green, slightly stalked oval leaves of 3–4½ cm (1.2–1.8 in) long and 1–1¾ cm (0.4–0.7 in) wide. The inflorescences are near the tip of the branches, cylinder-shaped and consist of 50–70 densely cropped flower heads, each in the axil of a green leaf, consisting of 25–35 golden yellow, faintly sweet scented flowers. It is endemic to the Fynbos ecoregion of South Africa and is found in two locations, in the Western Cape province. The flowering season is from March to May or June, but flower heads sometimes occur in any other part of the year.

== Description ==
Mimetes chrysanthus is an evergreen, upright, sparingly branching shrub of 1½–2 m (5–6½ ft) high, with a single main trunk of 4–6 cm (1⅔–2⅓ in) thick at its base. From this trunk develop stiff, upright branches of about 2 cm (¾ in) thick, covered by smooth grey bark. The flowering branches are 4–7 mm (0.16–0.28 in) thich and are covered with a dense layer of minute, powdery crisped hairs. The leaves are set alternately along the branches, lack stipules but are narrowed at their base to a stalk of 3–5 mm (0.12–0.20 in) long. The blade is broadly lance-shape to elliptic, 3–4½ cm (1.2–1.8 in) long and 1–1¾ cm (0.4–0.7 in) wide, initially with some minute, powdery crisped hairs, that will wear off with time. The margin is entire and the thickening at the tip is notched or even slightly split in two.

The inflorescence consists of fifty to seventy crowded flower heads, each in the axil of a leaf, that together constitute a cylinder shape of 6–9 cm (2.4–3.6 in) long, 5½–6 cm (2.2–2.4 in) wide, that is topped by a crest of more or less upright, smallish green leaves. Each flower head sits in the axil of a plain green leaf standing out horizontally. Each flower head contains as many as 25–35 individual flowers, while those lower down usually contain the fewest flowers. The bracts that encircle the flower heads are tightly overlapping. The bracts in the outer whorl are oval with a blunt tip, later slightly spade-shaped, 5–10 mm (0.2–0.4 in) long and 2–3 mm (0.08–0.12 in) wide, covered in dense woolly hairs at the base, rounded, thickened, and eventually hairless at the tip. The bracts in the inner whorl are 6–8 mm (¼–⅓ in) long and 1–1½ mm (0.04–0.06 in) wide, lance-shaped with a pointy tip, covered in dense silky hairs, cartilaginous in consistency but growing three to four times as large an becoming woody after fertilisation.

The bract subtending the individual flower is line-shaped with a pointy tip, ¾–1¼ cm long, silky hairy and with a tuft of longer straight hairs at the tip. The 4-merous perianth is bright yellow, 2½–2¾ mm (1.0–1.1 in) long, straight when still in bud, curving towards the stem when the flower opens but star-symmetrical thereafter. Unlike other Mimetes species, the flower lacks a tube at its base. The segments in the lower part are ¾–1 cm (0.3–0.4 in) long, hyaline in consistency, hairless, free and bent to the outside. The middle part forms a tube, because the segments are merged through interlocking hairs along the margins, of 6–8 mm (¼–⅓ in) long and is covered in dense powdery hairs. The segments in the upper part (or limbs), which enclosed the pollen presenter in the bud, are hairless, line-shaped with a pointy tip and 3–5 mm (0.12–0.20 in) long. From the centre of the perianth emerges a straight, yellow, thread-shaped style of 2½–3½ cm (1.0–1.4 in) long. The thickened part at the tip of the style called pollen presenter is 1–1¼ mm long (0.04–0.06 in), line-shaped, with a slight waist where it joins with the style, while the groove that functions as the stigma sits symmetrical across the very tip. The cylindrical ovary is difficult to distinguish from the style, 2 mm (0.08 in) long and covered in powdery hairs. It is subtended by four awl-shaped scales of 1–1½ mm (0.04–0.06 in) long. The ovary develops into an egg-shaped to cylindrical indehiscent, one-seeded fruit of 6–8 mm (¼–⅓ in) long and 4–5 mm (0.16–0.20 in) wide, covered in minute powdery hairs and eventually hairless. The flowers of Mimetes chrysanthus are sweetly scented.

=== Differences with related species ===
The golden pagoda differs from all other Mimetes species in the large number of flowers per head (25–35), compared to 14–22 flowers per head in M. saxatilis, and considerably less in all other species. Further, all other pagodas have a tube at the base of the perianth, where in M. chrysanthus, the segments are free and bending out at the base but connate midlength, and free and diverging near the tip.

== Taxonomy ==
Unexpectedly, the new and very conspicuous golden pagoda was discovered in 1987 by one of the gamekeepers at the Gamka Mountain Nature Reserve, Mr. Willie Julies. It was described by John Patrick Rourke in 1988, who called it Mimetes chrysanthus. The species is variably known as golden pagoda or golden mimetes in English and gouestompie [golden stump] in Afrikaans. The species name chrysanthus has been compounded from the Ancient Greek words χρῡσός (khrūsós) meaning "gold" and άνθος (ánthos) meaning "flower", in combination "golden flower", a reference to the luminous golden-yellow flowers.

== Distribution, habitat and ecology ==
The golden pagoda is known from two locations. The first, where the species was discovered is on the Gamkaberg, situated on the edge of the Little Karoo, the other on the Perdeberg near Herold. In Gamka it grows on steep, well-drained and nutrient-poor sandy slopes that face the summer winds that bring some rain and mist, though most precipitation fall during the winter, averaging 400–450 mm (15–18 in). Here it can be found at an altitude of 800–1040 m (2625–3415 ft) in several Sandstone Fynbos types, in particular the Outiniqua Sandstone Fynbos, the South, and the North Rooiberg Sandstone Fynbos.

The flowers are visited both by carpenter bees such as Xylocopa capensis, orange-breasted sunbirds and Cape sugarbirds, and produce copious amounts of nectar. Perhaps the bees are mostly responsible for pollination, considering the flowers are yellow, the colour that is most attractive to bees, while birds prefer red. The fruits, that are protected by the enlarged, woody bracts, take about eight months to mature and fall to the ground around December. Here, they are collected by ants that carry them to their underground nests.

== Conservation ==
The golden pagoda is considered a vulnerable species because although it is known from only two locations, its populations are stable. A possible threat would be too frequent wildfires.
