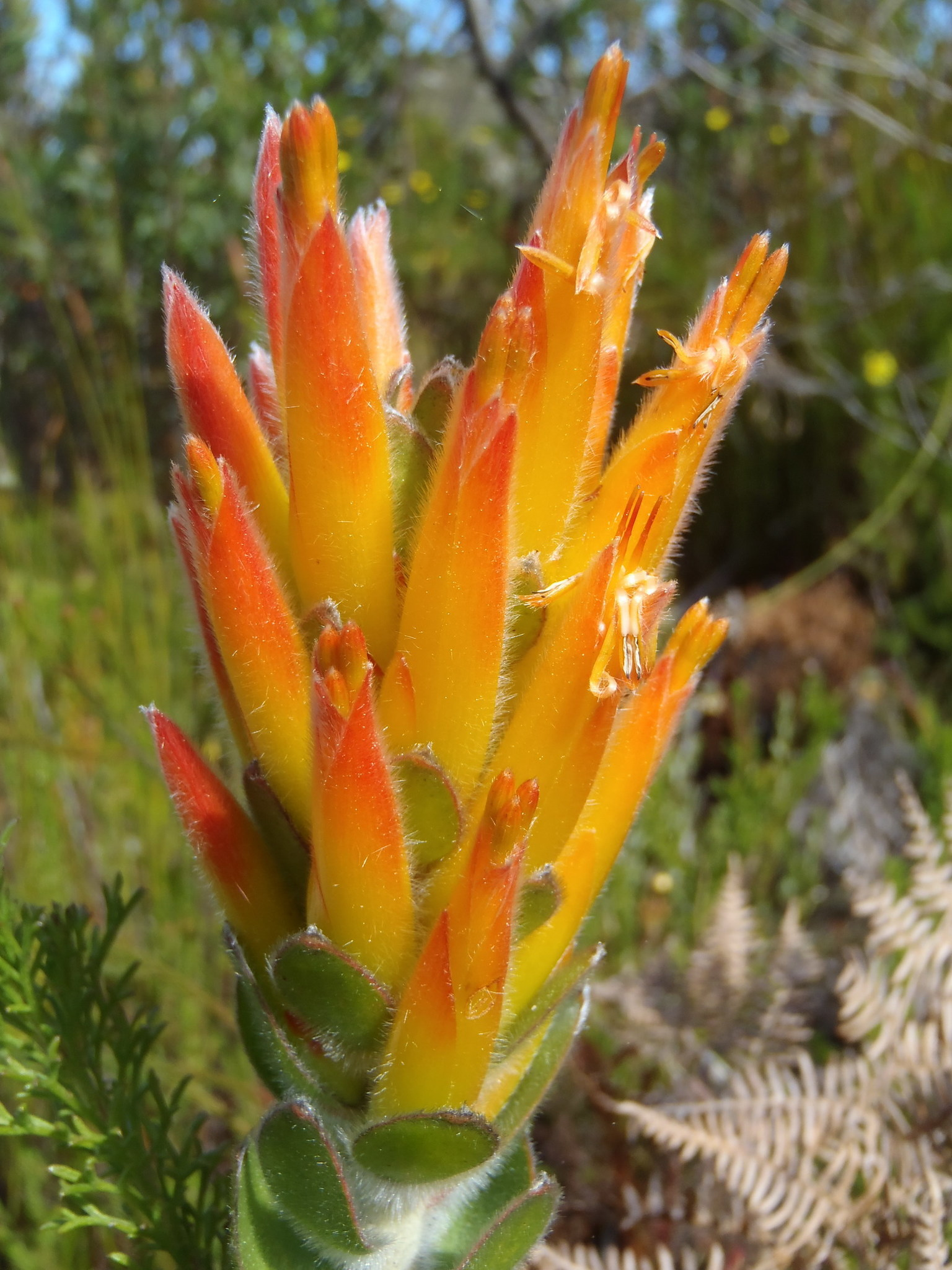

Conservation status
- Near Threatened (IUCN 3.1)

Scientific classification
- Kingdom: Plantae
- Clade: Tracheophytes
- Clade: Angiosperms
- Clade: Eudicots
- Order: Proteales
- Family: Proteaceae
- Genus: Mimetes
- Species: M. pauciflorus

Binomial name
- Mimetes pauciflorus R.Br.

Synonyms
- Protea pauciflora; Mimetes rehmanni

= Mimetes pauciflorus =

Species of plant endemic to South Africa

Mimetes pauciflorus, the three-flowered pagoda, is an evergreen, shyly branching, upright shrub of 2–4 (6½–13 ft) high, from the family Proteaceae. It has narrowly to broadly oval leaves of 2½–4 cm (1.0–1.6 in) long and ¾–2 cm (0.3–0.8 in) wide, on the upper parts of the branches, the lower parts leafless with a reddish brown bark. The inflorescences at the top of the shoots are cylinder-shaped, 10–40 cm (4–16 in) long and contain forty to one hundred twenty densely crowded flower heads, at a steep upward angle, hiding a crest of very small, almost vertical leaves. The flower heads each consist of three, rarely four individual flowers. The flowers are tightly enclosed by four or five orange-yellow, fleshy, pointy, lance-shaped involucral bracts, and three orange-yellow, 4–5½ cm (1.6–2.4 in) long bracteoles. It grows on always moist, south-facing slopes in the southern coastal mountains of South Africa. Flowers can be found from August to November, with a peak in September.

== Description ==
Mimetes pauciflorus is an evergreen shrub, that develops from a main stem of up to 5 cm (2 in) in diameter. It initially produces shyly branching, vigorous, upright, felty shoots, of 6–8 mm (¼–⅓ in) thick, that grow about ½ m (1½ ft) per year. Later, growth slows down and inflorescences are produced, while leaves will have been shed from the older parts of the shoots, revealing the smooth reddish brown bark. Plants eventually may reach a height of 2–4 m (6½–13 ft). The leathery leaves are alternately set, at an upward angle and overlapping and lack both stipules and leaf stalks. The leaves are narrow to broadly oval with an entire margin and a blunt thickened tip, 2½–4 cm (1.0–1.6 in) long and ¾–2 cm (0.3–0.8 in) wide. Its surface has rather few felty hairs and a fringe of felty hairy.

The inflorescences at the top of the shoots are cylinder-shaped, are 10–40 cm (4–16 in) long and contain forty to one hundred twenty densely crowded flower heads, at a steep upward angle, hiding a crest of very small, almost vertical leaves. The flower heads consist of three, rarely four individual flowers and sit in the axils of inconspicuous, ordinary, flat, green leaves. The four to five bracts that tightly enclose the flower heads are orange-yellow, fleshy, lance-shaped with a pointy tip, 1–2½ cm (0.4–1.0 in) long and ½–¾ cm (0.2–0.3 in) wide, the outer hairless, the inner softly hairy at the tip.

The bracts that subtend the individual flowers are lance-shaped with a pointy tip, 4–5½ cm (1.6–2.4 in) long and 1½–1½ cm (0.5–0.6 in) wide, hairless at base but felty hairy near the tip. The straight cream-coloured 4-merous perianth is 4½–5 cm (1.8–2.0 in) long. The lower part called tube, that remains merged when the flower is open, is 2–3 mm (0.08–0.12 in) long, cartilaginous, expanded bulb-like near its base and hairless. The four segments in the middle part (or claws), are thread-shaped and carry some long, straight, spreading hairs. The bright red segments in the upper part (or limbs), which enclosed the pollen presenter in the bud, are very narrowly line-shaped with a pointy tip, 5–6 mm (0.20–0.24 in) long, and hairless. The four anthers lack a filament and are directly connected to the limbs. From the center of the perianth emerges a style of 4½–5 cm (1¾–2 in) long, that tapers towards the pollen presenter. The thickened part at the tip of the style called pollen presenter is threat- to line-shaped with a pointy tip, 3–4 mm (0.12–0.16 in) long, with a slight ring at its base, and the groove that functions as the stigma across the very tip. The ovary is egg-shaped, densely powdery hairy, about 2 mm (0.08 in) long, and is subtended by four blunt, oblong scales of about 1 mm (0.04 in) long. It eventually develops into a cylinder-shaped fruit of about 7 mm (0.28 in) long and 3½ mm (0.14 in) in diameter.

In M. pauciflora, the number of flowers per head is reduced down to three (rarely four), and the involucral bracts are short. The bright yellow bracteoles of the three flowers together form a long, straight and narrow tube, from which only the perianth limbs and pollen presenters extend. The tube-type flower head functions comparable to tube-shaped corollas, such as in the large-flowered Erica species. The three-flowered pagoda is the only Mimetes species with these so-called tube-type flower heads.

=== Differences with related species ===
The three-flowered pagoda can be distinguished from other Mimetes species by the entire, oval leaves and only three flowers per orange-yellow coloured head.

== Taxonomy ==
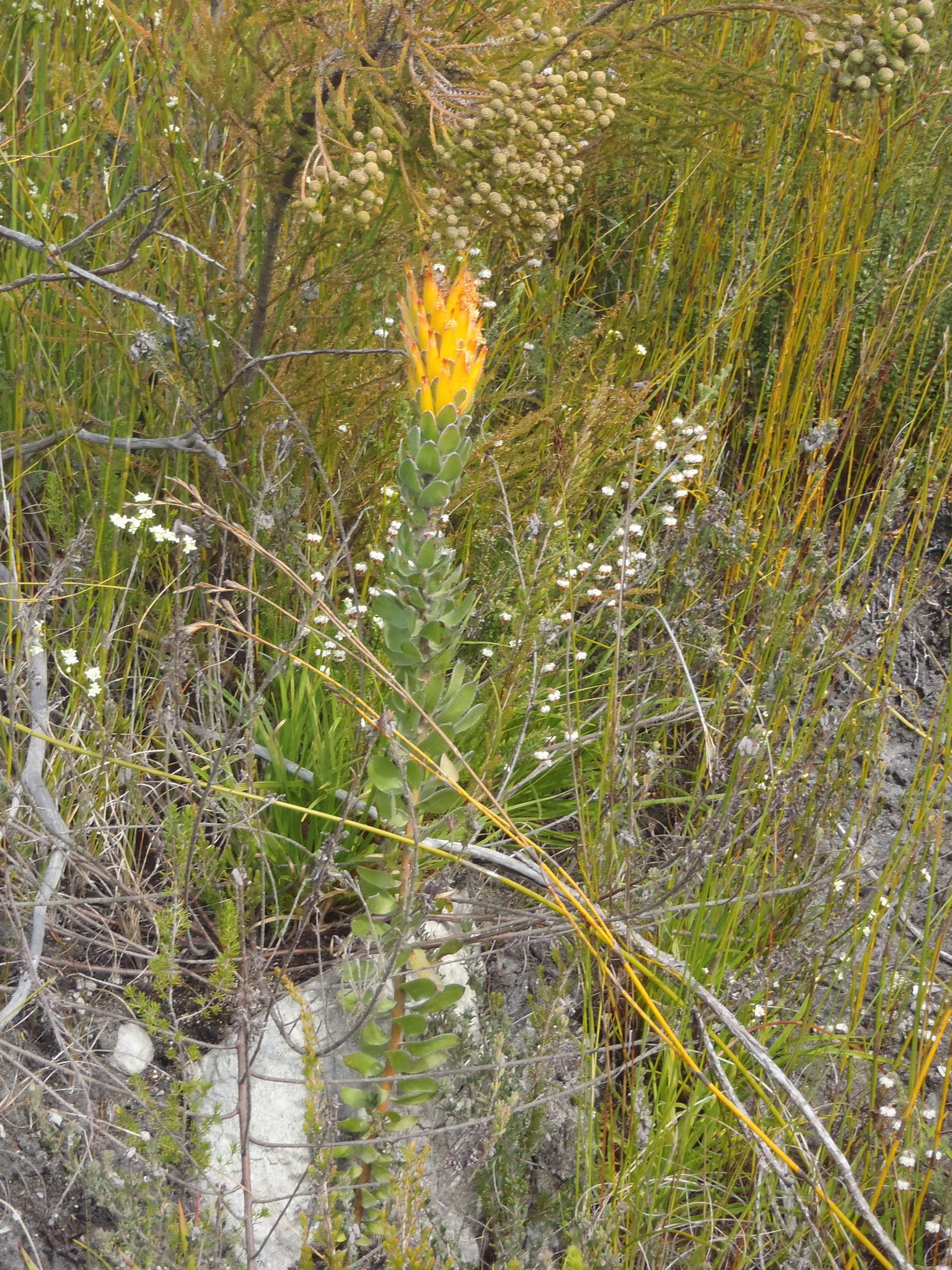
M. pauciflorus in a vegetation with Brunia lanuginosa

The three-flowered pagoda was described by Robert Brown in a paper called On the natural order of plants called Proteaceae, and called it Mimetes pauciflorus in 1810. He had based it on a specimen that had been collected by William Roxburgh in Africa Australis. Following Linnaeus in his preference to have larger genera, Jean Louis Marie Poiret reassigned the species, creating Protea pauciflora. Based on another specimen, from Montagu Pass, Michel Gandoger and Hans Schinz in 1913 described M. rehmanni, honoring its collector, the Polish explorer and botanist Anton Rehmann. John Patrick Rourke in 1984 regarded both types as belonging to the same species.

== Distribution and habitat ==
Mimetes pauciflorus has a relatively large distribution. It can be found in an at most 8 km (5.0 mi) wide strip along the south-facing slopes of the coastal mountains along the south coast, between the Ruitersberg, north of Mossel Bay in the Western Cape to slightly beyond Formosa Peak in the Eastern Cape.

It occurs in South Outeniqua Sandstone Fynbos and Tsitsikamma Sandstone Fynbos, a very dense and high vegetation type, together with species like Brunia lanuginosa, Erica hispidula, Leucadendron conicum, L. eucalyptifolium and Widdringtonia cupressoides. It can be found on slopes at 450–1400 m (1500–4600 ft) altitude, which are moist year-round and receive at least 1000 mm (40 in) of precipitation per year. Flower heads can be found from August to November, peaking in September. It is assumed that like other Mimetes species, the three-flowered pagoda is pollinated by birds and the seeds are distributed by ants.

== Conservation ==
The three-flowered pagoda is considered a vulnerable species due to a loss of habitat of over 30% converted into forest. Further threats may be competition by invasive species, and gathering of the flowers.
