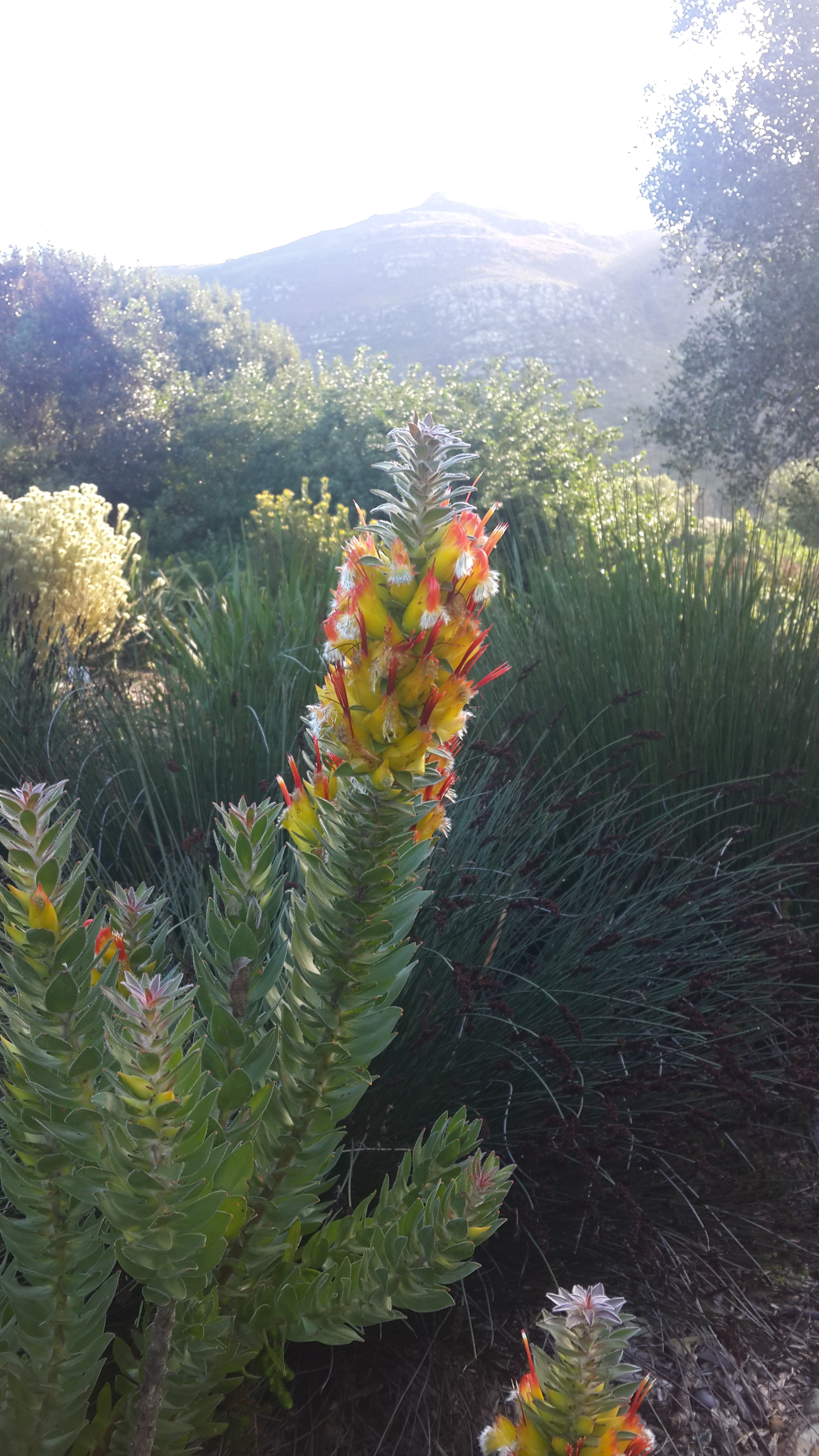
- Habit and individual flower head
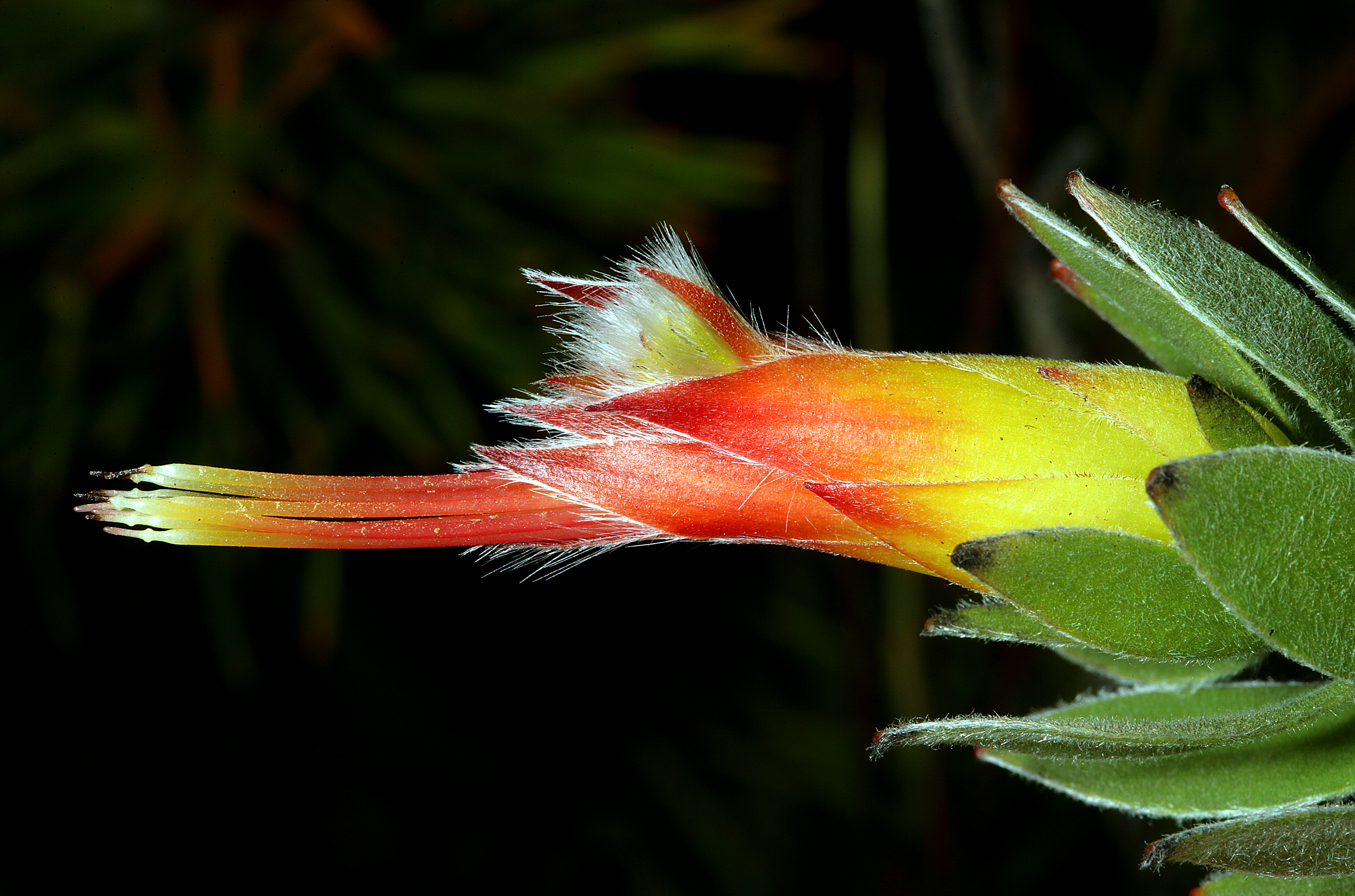

Conservation status
- Vulnerable (IUCN 3.1)

Scientific classification
- Kingdom: Plantae
- Clade: Tracheophytes
- Clade: Angiosperms
- Clade: Eudicots
- Order: Proteales
- Family: Proteaceae
- Genus: Mimetes
- Species: M. hirtus

Binomial name
- Mimetes hirtus (L.) Salisb.

Synonyms
- Leucadendron hirtum; Protea hirta

= Mimetes hirtus =

Species of plant from South Africa

Mimetes hirtus is an upright, evergreen shrub of 1½–2 m (5–6½ ft) high from the family Proteaceae. It has upright, overlapping, (broadly) lance-shaped leaves, without teeth, but with one thickened pointy tip. It has cylindric inflorescences topped by a pineapple-like tuft of pinkish-brownish, smaller and more or less horizontal leaves. The flowerheads are tightly enclosed by yellow, red-tipped bracts, only the 9–14 long red styles and the whitish silky tips of the perianth sticking out. It is primarily pollinated by the Cape sugarbird. It is an endemic species of the southwest of the Western Cape province of South Africa, and grows in wet zones at the base of south-facing mountain slopes. Flower heads may be found from May to November, but peaks in July and August. The species has several vernacular names of which marsh pagoda seems to be used most.

== Description ==
Mimetes hirtus is an evergreen, well-branched, upright shrub of 1½–2 m (5–6½ ft) high, that develops from a single trunk of up to 7½ cm (3 in) thick, covered with a sooth red bark. The stiffly upright branches are initially covered in dense felty or woolly hairs, but these soon wear off. The leaves are set alternately along the branches, at an upward angle and overlapping. They have a lance-shaped to broadly lance-shaped outline, are 2½–4½ cm (1.0–1.8 in) long and ½–1¾ cm (0.2–0.7 in) wide, with a pointy thickened tip, and initially carry some felty hairs and a row of felty hairs along the entire margin, which later wear off.

The inflorescences are broadly cylinder-shaped, 8–14 cm (3¼–5¾ in) long and 8–9 cm (3¼–3½ in) in diameter, with a tuft of smaller, pinkish, not very upright leaves. It consists of up to fourteen flower head that each contain nine to fourteen individual flowers and sit in the axil of an ordinary flat green leaf. The outer whorl of bracts that encircle the flower heads are bright yellow with red tips, pointy lance-shaped, 1½–4 cm (0.6–1.6 in) long and ½–1¼ cm (0.2–0.5 in) wide, papery in consistency, mostly hairless but sometime with a few silky hairs, the margins towards the tip with a row of silky hairs, and are tightly enveloping the flowers. The inner bracts are narrowly lance-shaped with a pointy tip, sickle-shaped, thinly papery in consistency, 2–4 cm (0.8–1.6 in) long and 4–6 mm (0.12–0.16 in) wide, slightly silky hairy along the margins.

The bract subtending the individual flower is line- to awl-shaped, 5–8 mm (0.20–0.32 in) long and about 1 mm (0.04 in) wide, hairless except for a row of minute hairs along the edges. The 4-merous perianth is 3–4 cm (1.2–1.4 in) long and straight. The lower part, that remains merged when the flower is open, is squared in cross-section, hairless and about ½ cm (0.2 in) long. The segments in the middle part (or claws), are thread-shaped, slightly powdery hairy near the base and silky hairy towards the top. The segments in the upper part (or limbs), which enclosed the pollen presenter in the bud, are line-shaped with a pointy tip in outline, boat-shaped, and covered in silky hairs. The four anthers lack a filament and each is directly merged with one of the limbs. From the centre of the perianth emerges a red-coloured style of 5–5½ cm (2.0–2.2 in) long that is slightly bent. The thickened part at the tip of the style called pollen presenter is about 4 mm (0.16 in) long, has a ring-shaped thickening at its base and the groove that functions as the stigma sits across the very tip. The ovary is egg-shaped, minutely powdery and about 2 mm long (0.04 in). It is subtended by four fleshy, blunt, rounded rectangular scales of about 2 mm (0.08 in) long. The ovary will develop into a cylindric fruit of 6–7 mm (0.24–0.28 in) long and 1½–2 mm (0.06–0.08 in) wide.

== Taxonomy ==
The oldest known reference to the marsh pagoda was made by Herman Boerhaave, who described it as lepidocarpodendron; foliis sericeis brevibus confertissime natis, fructu gracile longo [tree with scaled fruits, short leaves silky, initially cropped, long graceful fruits] in 1720. Carl Linnaeus gave the marsh pagoda the first proper binominal Leucadendron hirtum in 1760. When in 1771, he decided to collapse Mimetes into Protea he created the new combination Protea hirta. Richard Anthony Salisbury in a book by Joseph Knight titled On the cultivation of the plants belonging to the natural order of Proteeae, published in 1809, reassigned the marsh pagoda to his newly created genus Mimetes, creating the name Mimetes hirtus.

=== Naming ===
Mimetes hirtus is variously known as marsh pagoda, tall pagoda, red and yellow bottlebrush, hairy mimetes, or pineapple bush in English and vleistompie or pynappelstompie in Afrikaans. The species name hirtus is a Latin word meaning roughly hairy, because its hairiness contrasts with the glabrous species M. cucullatus.

== Distribution, habitat and ecology ==
The marsh pagoda is an endemic species that grows along the foot of the coastal mountains on the southern coast of the Western Cape province of South Africa. In the west, it grows in the wild on the Cape Peninsula, between Buffelsbaai and Silvermine Nature Reserve. Previously however, it could be found as far north as Rondebosch. Further east, it can be found from Hangklip near Pringle Bay, along the foot of the Kogelberg Nature Reserve at Betty's Bay and Kleinmond, Hermanus, and the southern foot of the hills towards Elim, where it reaches its southeastern limit. It seldom grows at an altitude exceeding 50 m (165 ft), except for the populations Silvermine and Highlands that occur at about 400 m (1300 ft) elevation.

The marsh pagoda prefers a swampy habitat or the bank of streams, where it may form dense stands and forms a vegetation together with species such as Osmitopsis asteriscoides, Erica perspicua and Psoralea aphylla.

Like other Mimetes species, the marsh pagoda is adapted to pollination by birds, in this case in particular the Cape sugarbird. This species sits on top of the inflorescence and brushes against the pollen presenters. Visits of the orange-breasted sunbird are less effective because this species sits below the inflorescence and so largely avoids the pollen presenters. After the fruits have fallen, native ants collect these and carry them to their underground nests. Here, they eat the elaiosome, and the hard grey seeds remain protected against being eaten and fire, until they germinate after an overhead fire and subsequent rains.

Like most shrubs in its habitat, the marsh pagoda is short-lived. They initially grow vigorously, and may often start flowering already in their second year. It continues growing and flowering profusely until around fifteen years, old age sets in.

== Conservation ==
The marsh pagoda is considered a vulnerable species because, although it has a considerable distribution, its habitat has been reduced by at least 50% due to agriculture and urban development, and is projected to decline further.
