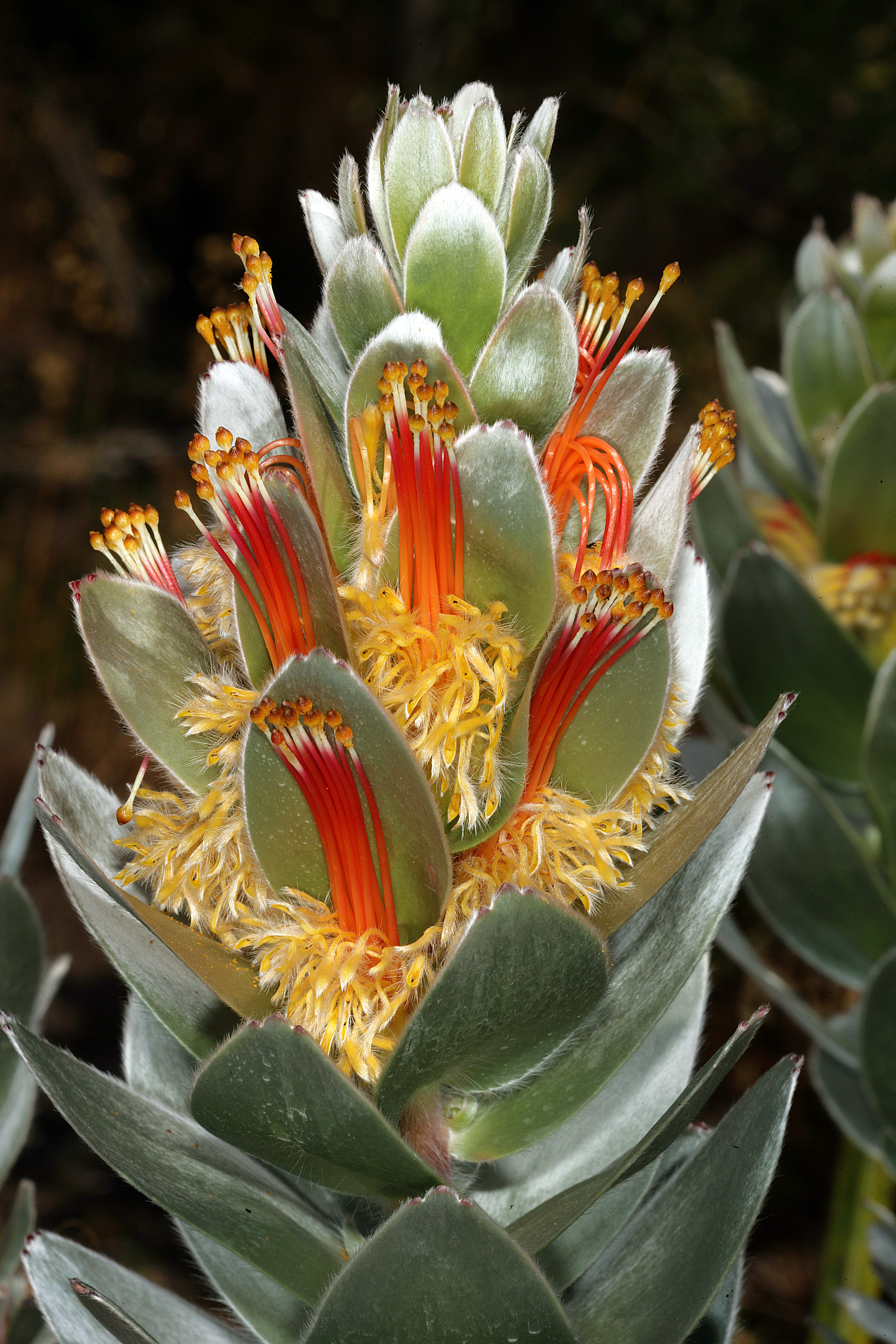

Conservation status
- Vulnerable (IUCN 3.1)

Scientific classification
- Kingdom: Plantae
- Clade: Tracheophytes
- Clade: Angiosperms
- Clade: Eudicots
- Order: Proteales
- Family: Proteaceae
- Genus: Mimetes
- Species: M. hottentoticus

Binomial name
- Mimetes hottentoticus E.Phillips & Hutch.

= Mimetes hottentoticus =

Species of plant endemic to South Africa

Mimetes hottentoticus is an evergreen, upright shrub of 1.5–3 m (5–10 ft) high from the family Proteaceae. It has silvery, broadly egg-shaped to egg-shaped leaves with three small teeth crowded at the tip. The flower heads and subtending leaves form a cylindric inflorescence, topped with a tuft of smaller, more or less upright silvery or pinkish leaves. Each flowerhead contains 8–12 flowers with conspicuously red styles, that are all parallel, projected straight up, pushing against the leaf subtending the higher flowerhead. The styles end in a short white zone topped by a thick blackish pollen presenter. Flowers can usually be found from January till March, few may persist into May. It is called silver pagoda or matchstick pagoda in English and Hottentotstompie in Afrikaans.

== Description ==
Mimetes hottentoticus is an evergreen shrub of mostly 1.5 m (5–7 ft), occasionally up to 3 m (10 ft) high, which has upright branches that develop from a single trunk of up to 10 cm (4 in) thick, but its shape may vary from slender and sparingly branching to rounded and profusely branching, in which case it may reach a diameter of about 2 m (7 ft). The branches are 5–8 mm (0.20–0.32 in) thick and are initially covered with greyish felty hairs, but older growth has lost both its indumentum and its leaves. The leaves are set alternately along the branches, at an upward angle or slightly overlapping. They lack stipules and leaf stalks, are egg-shaped or broadly egg-shaped in outline, 5–7.5 cm (2–3 in) long and 2¾–4 cm (1.1–1.8 in) wide, with an entire margin except for three blunt teeth close together at the tip of the leaf, seldom without teeth. The surface is silvery because it is covered in dense silky hairs, and felty hairs along the margins.

The inflorescence is broadly cylinder-shaped, 7–14 cm (2.8-5.7 in) long and 7–12 cm (2.8–4.8 in) in diameter, topped by a tuft of smallish, more or less upright, egg-shaped or narrowly egg-shaped, silvery hairy leaves, sometimes tinged pink. In the axils of the higher leaves are flower heads each containing eight to twelve flowers, the subtending leaves not different from the lower leaves being silvery and flat. The outer whorl of bracts that encircle the flower heads are lance-shaped with a pointy tip, 1.5–2.3 cm (0.6–0.9 in) long and 0.2–0.5 cm (0.08–0.20 in) wide, grey felty hairy, the inner whorl narrowly lance-shaped.

The bract subtending the individual flower is linear to awl-shaped and 12–16 mm (0.48–0.64 in) long, about 1 mm (0.04 in) wide and covered in very dense felty hairs. The cream coloured 4-merous perianth is 3.5–3.8 cm (1.4–1.7 in) long. The lower part, that remains merged when the flower is open, is hairless, square in cross section, and about 4–5 mm (0.16–0.20 in) long. The segments in the middle part (or claws), are thread-shaped, covered in dense felty hairs. The segments in the upper part (or limbs), which enclosed the pollen presenter in the bud, are lance-shaped with a pointy tip and covered in felty hairs. The anthers are directly merged to the limbs, lack a filament, are oblong with blunt tips, the part that connects the anther lobes has a mostly minutely forked tip. From the centre of the perianth emerges style of 6.5–7 cm (2.6–2.8 in) long, brilliantly red in colour with a small white tip just below the pollen presenter. The thickened part at the tip of the style called pollen presenter is about 4 mm (0.16 in) long, blackish in colour, inverted cone- to head-shaped, with a nipple-like tip that contains the sigmatic groove across the middle. The ovary is very finely silky hairy, about 3–4 mm long (0.12–0.16 in) and difficult to distinguish from the style. It is subtended by four fleshy line- to awl-shaped scales of 2–3 mm (0.08–0.12 in) long.

== Taxonomy ==
As far as it is known, the first person to collect the silver pagoda for science was Thomas Pearson Stokoe, who came across this species in November 1921. He visited the location of his earlier find near the end of February 1922, when he collected flowering specimens. The species was described in 1923 by South African botanists Edwin Percy Phillips and John Hutchinson, who named it Mimetes hottentoticus.

=== Naming ===
The species name hottentoticus refers to the Hottentots Holland Mountains near its distribution area.

== Distribution, habitat and ecology ==
The three known populations of the matchstick pagoda can be found near the Kogelberg Peak, at an elevation between 1000 and 1250 m (3250–4150 ft). There it grows in peaty seeps on acidic sandy soil poor in nutrients derived from quartzite, in a vegetation type called Kogelberg Sandstone Fynbos amongst other species like the Resionid Elegia mucronata, Brunia alopecuroides, and Erica desmantha. These locations are always moist with an average annual precipitation of more than 2,000 mm (79 in), during the winter when most rain is falling with northwesterly wind, and during the summer due to frequent mist from seawinds from the southeast.

The species is pollinated by birds, flowers from January to May with a peak in February. The fruits are ripe about half a year after flowering and fall to the ground. They are collected by native ants that carry the fruits to their underground nest, where the ants bread is eaten and the seeds remain protected. The seeds germinate after an overhead fieldfire. Plants do not survive fires.

== Conservation ==
The matchstick pagoda is considered a critically endangered species, due to its very limited distribution area of 17 km^{2} (6.6 sq mi) and its strongly fluctuating population. Negative impacts may arise from too high frequency wildfires, seed collection, habitat destruction and Phytophthora infection.
