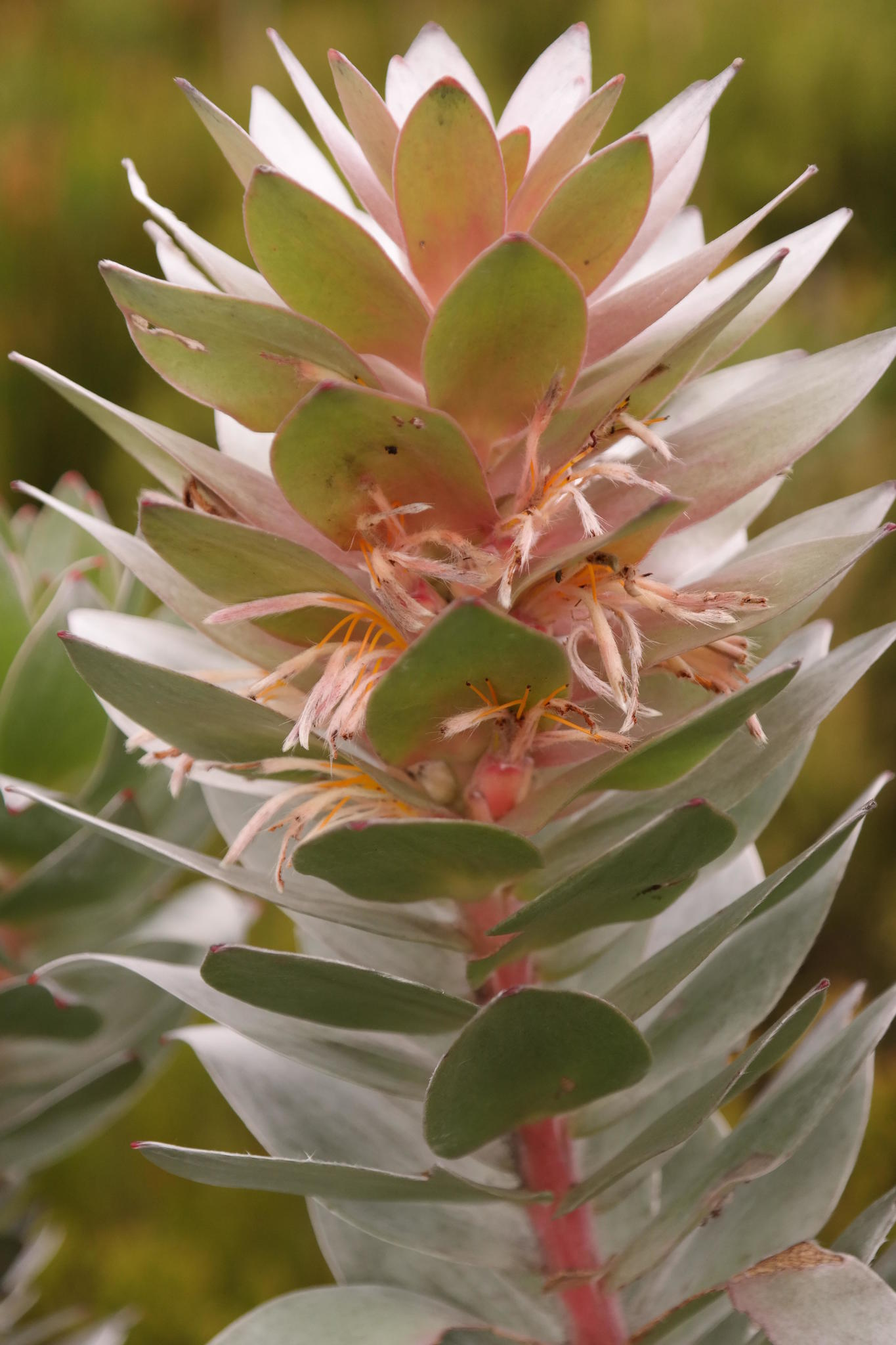

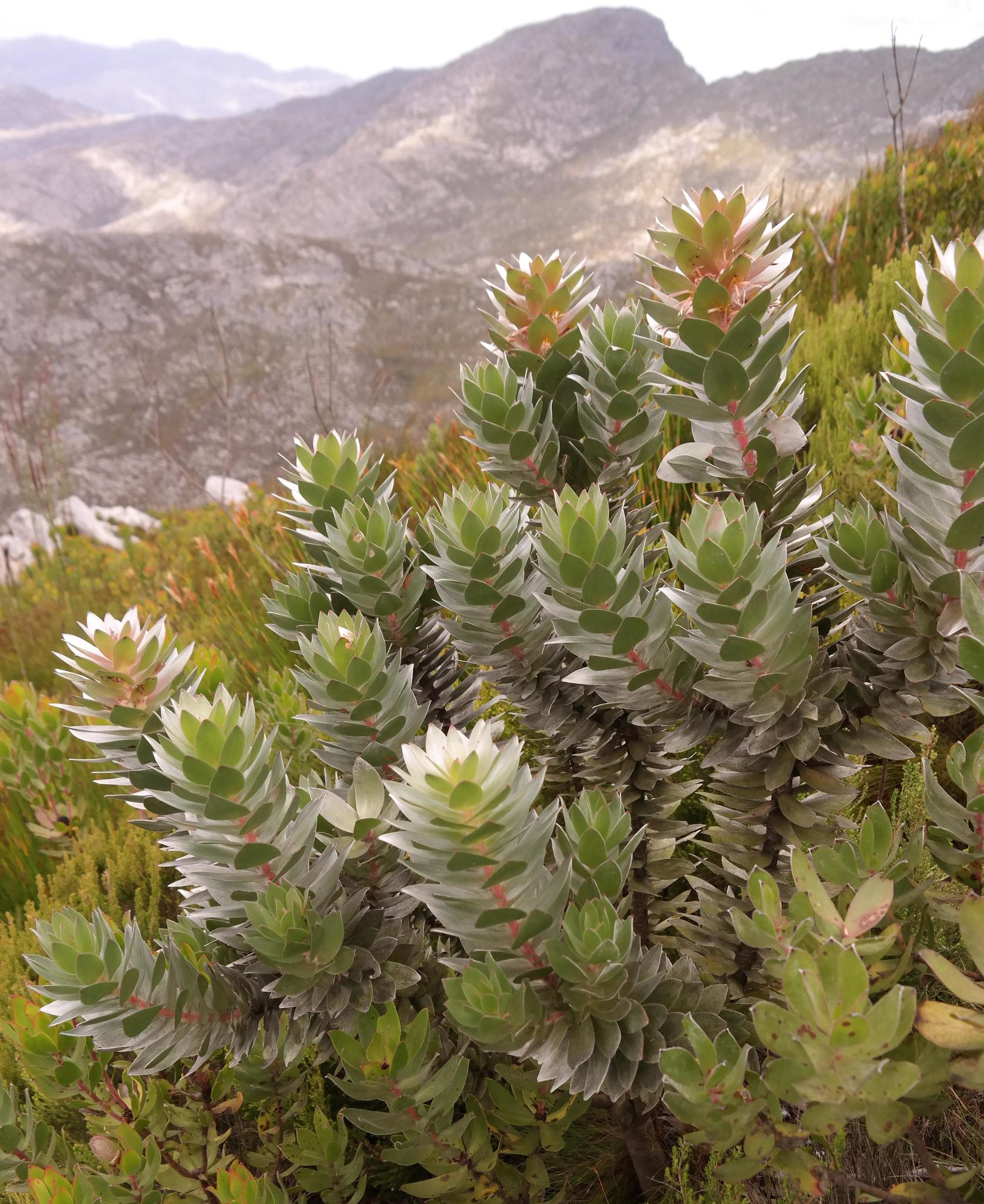

Conservation status
- Endangered (IUCN 3.1)

Scientific classification
- Kingdom: Plantae
- Clade: Tracheophytes
- Clade: Angiosperms
- Clade: Eudicots
- Order: Proteales
- Family: Proteaceae
- Genus: Mimetes
- Species: M. arboreus

Binomial name
- Mimetes arboreus Rourke

= Mimetes arboreus =

Species of plant endemic to South Africa

Mimetes arboreus, or Kogelberg pagoda, is an evergreen, upright large shrub or small tree of 2–6 m (6½–20 ft) high in the family Proteaceae. It grows from a thick trunk with a smooth grey bark that branches at ½–1 m (1½–3 ft) above the ground. It has silvery, lance-shaped, pointy leaves of 5–8¼ cm (2.0–3.3 in) long and ¾–3¼ cm (0.3–1.3 in) wide, at an upward angle and overlapping each other. The inflorescences are set just below the top of the branches, are cylinder-shaped, 8–10 cm (3¼–4 in) in diameter, topped by a crest of more or less horizontal pinkish or reddish tinged leaves. It consists of several flower heads in the axils of pinkish orange leaves that form a hood shielding the underlying flower head. Each flower head contains eight to thirteen individual flowers, with bright red styles and grey silky perianth lobes. It is endemic to the Fynbos ecoregion of South Africa, being confined to the Kogelberg mountain range.

== Description ==
Mimetes arboreus is a large shrub or small tree of 2–6 m (6½–20 ft) high that grows from a smooth, stout, prominent trunk of 10–36 cm (⅓–1 ft) wide. Branches occur from ½–1 m (1½–3 ft) above the ground which fork regularly higher up and so constitute a rounded crown. The trunk and branches are covered in a smooth grey bark with horizontal stripes that develops lower down into a corky layer of about 1 cm (0.4 in) thick, crossed by a network of cracks. The pointy, lance-shaped leaves are set alternately along the branches, at an upward angle and overlapping, and lack both stipules and stalk. They are 5–8¼ cm (2.0–3.3 in) long and ¾–3¼ cm (0.3–1.3 in) wide, silvery due to a dense layer of silky hairs, have an entire margin with a reddish amber-coloured thickened tip, seldom with three teeth.

The inflorescences are set just below the top of the branches, are cylinder-shaped, 8–10 cm (3¼–4 in) in diameter, topped by a crest of more or less horizontal pinkish or reddish tinged leaves. It consists of several flower heads in the axils of pinkish orange leaves at a moderate upward angle that form a hood shielding the underlying flower head. Each flower head contains eight to thirteen individual flowers. The outer whorl of bracts that encircle the flower heads are equal in size, cartilaginous in consistency but becoming woody when dry, oblong to oval in shape, 1–1¾ cm (0.4–0.7 in) long and ½–¾ cm (0.2–0.3 in) wide, silky hairy and with a row of equal length hairs along its rim. The bracts on the inside of the head are roughly hairy, oblong or narrowly oblong and 1–2 cm (0.4–0.8 in) long and 2–3 mm (0.08–0.12 in) wide.

The bract subtending the individual flower is line-shaped, about 1½ cm (0.6 in) long and 1–2 mm (0.04–0.08 in) wide, and covered in dense rough hairs. The 4-merous perianth is mostly pink, sometimes yellow, straight when in the bud and 3–4 cm (1.2–1.6 in) long. The lower part, that remains merged when the flower is open, is about 3 mm (0.12 in) long, hairless, square in cross-section at its base and inflated at the top. The four segments in the middle part (or claws), are line-shaped and (sometimes densely) silky hairy. The segments in the upper part (or limbs), which enclosed the pollen presenter in the bud, are line-shaped in outline, boat-shaped with a pointy tip, silky hairy and about 1 cm (0.4 in). The four anthers lack a filament and are directly connected to the limbs, line- to thread-shaped, with the connecting tissue sticking out in a point at the tip. From the centre of the perianth emerges a straight, hairless, thread-shaped style of 4½–5½ cm (2.2–2.4 in) long. The thickened part at the tip of the style called pollen presenter is line- to thread-shaped with a pointy tip, narrower where it joins with the style, slightly bent with a groove that functions as the stigma across the tip, 7–8 mm (about ⅓ in) long. The egg-shaped ovary is densely covered in silky hairs pressed against its surface, and about 2 mm (0.04–0.08 in) long. This develops into an egg-shaped fruit, eventually about 1 cm long and ½ cm across.

== Taxonomy ==
As far as known, the Kogelberg silver pagoda was first collected by Thomas Pearson Stokoe in 1921 at Hangklip near Pringle Bay. It was described and named Mimetes arboreus in 1982 by John Patrick Rourke.

== Distribution and habitat ==
Mimetes arboreus is an endemic species restricted to the Kogelberg Nature Reserve, from Steenbras Ridge in the North to Pringle Peak near Betty's Bay in the south. It grows on steep slopes near the sea, mostly the cooler southern or southeastern face on altitudes varying between 450 m (1500 ft) and 1200 m (4000 ft).

Mimetes arboreus is a slow growing and relatively long lived species. Specimens were observed to start flowering at an age of around fifteen years. The thick bark gives it some protection to fire, and new growth appears at the tip of the highest branches.

== Conservation ==
The Kogelberg pagoda is considered an endangered species due to the limited areas where its populations occupy 45 km^{2} (17 sq mi) within a distribution area of 94 km^{2} (36 sq mi) and its small (around 1000 plants), fluctuating population. Negative impacts may arise from too high frequency wildfires, Phytophthora, and competition by invasive species.
