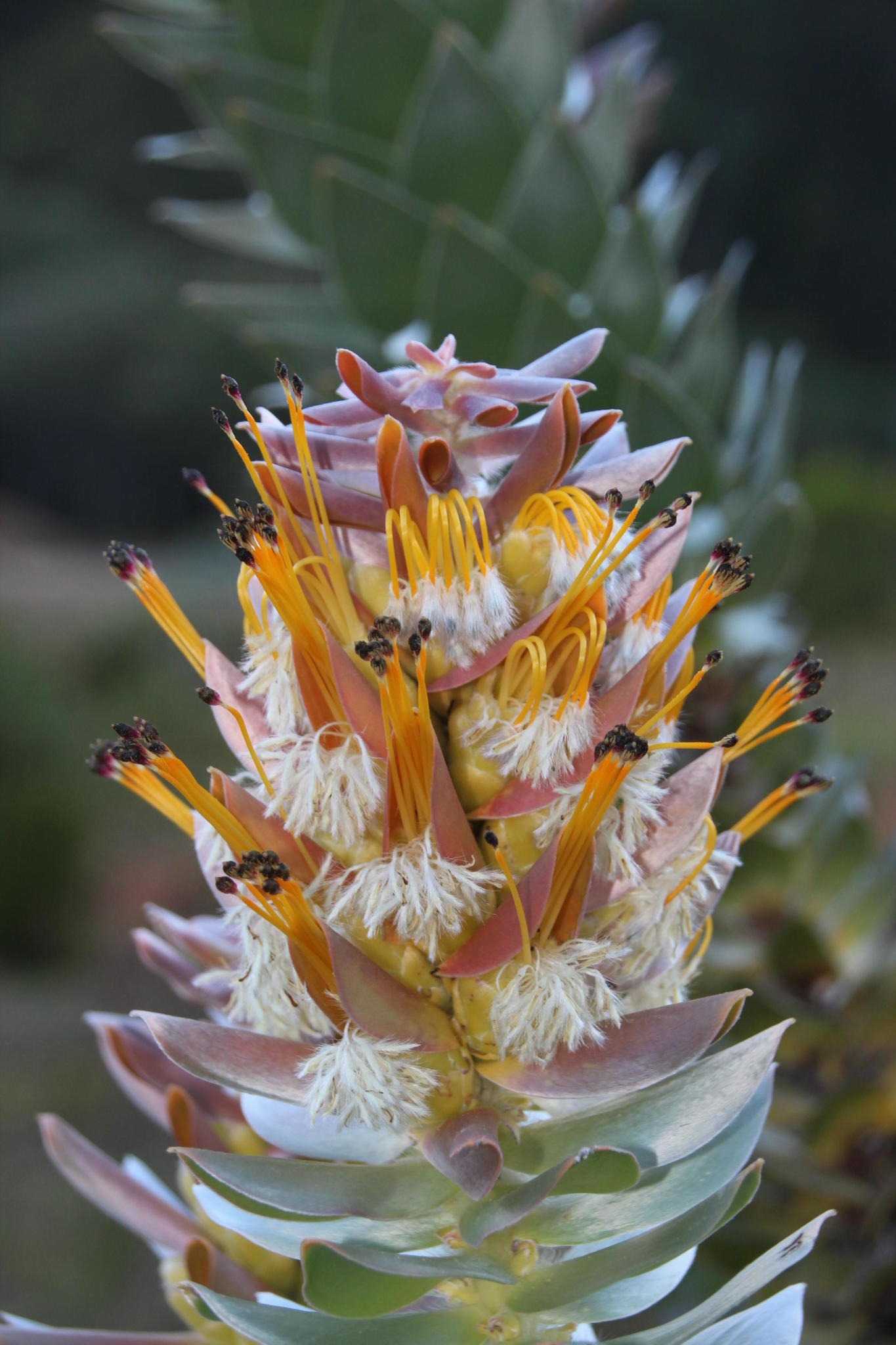

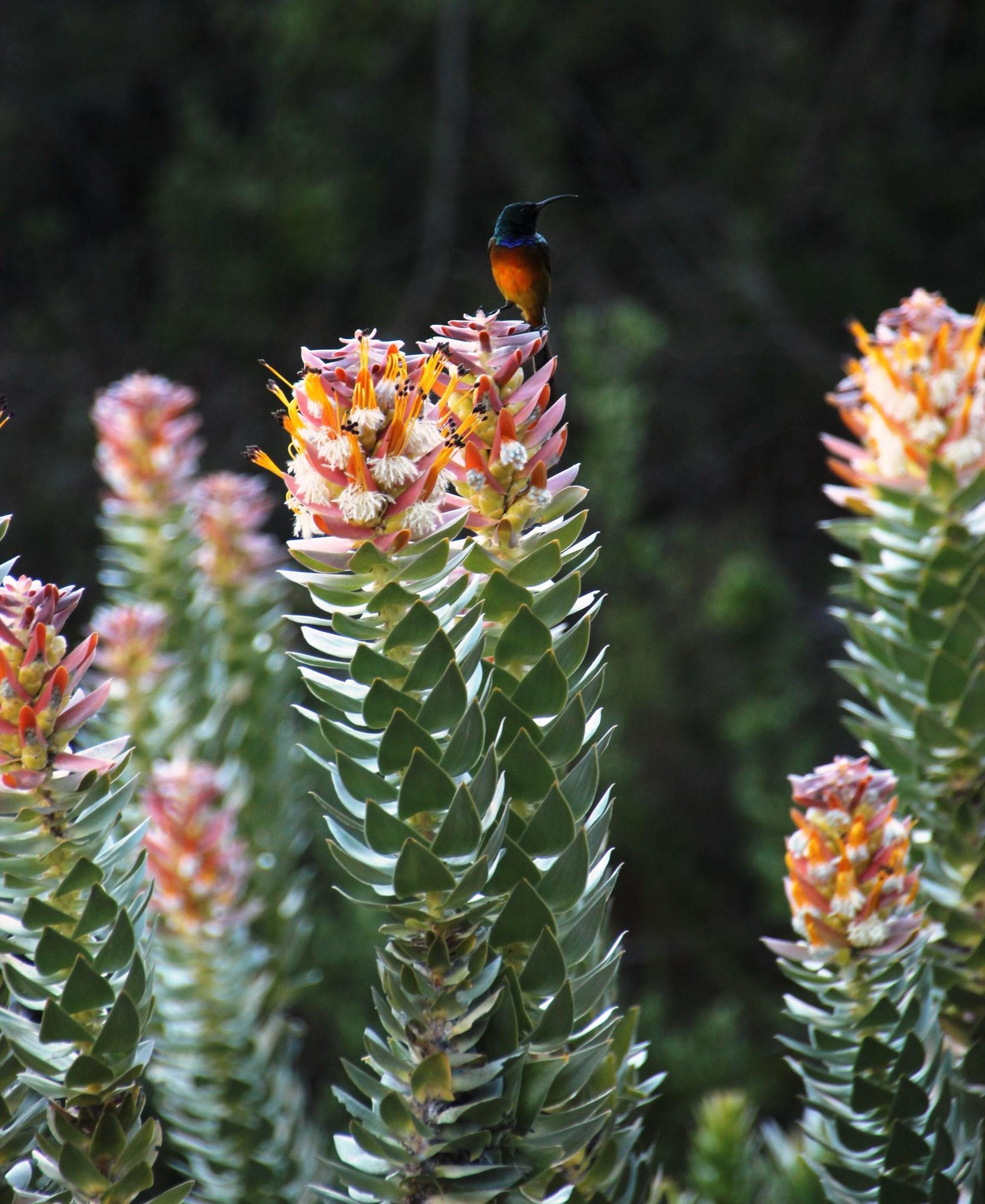
- Flowerheads

Conservation status
- Critically Endangered (IUCN 3.1)

Scientific classification
- Kingdom: Plantae
- Clade: Tracheophytes
- Clade: Angiosperms
- Clade: Eudicots
- Order: Proteales
- Family: Proteaceae
- Genus: Mimetes
- Species: M. stokoei

Binomial name
- Mimetes stokoei E.Phillips & Hutch.

= Mimetes stokoei =

Species of evergreen plant

Mimetes stokoei, the mace pagoda, is an evergreen, upright, hardly branching, large shrub of 1–2 m (3–6 1/2 ft) high in the family Proteaceae. It has silvery, oval leaves of 5–8 cm (2.0–3.2 in) long and 2 1/2–4 cm (1.0–1.6 in) wide, with one large tooth supported by two smaller teeth near the tip, at an upward angle and somewhat overlapping each other. The inflorescences are set just below the growing tip, are cylinder-shaped, 10–12 cm (4–5 in) high, topped by a crest of small, more or less horizontal, pinkish-purple tinged leaves. It consists of several flower heads in the axils of golden leaves with a pinkish wash that form a hood shielding the underlying flower head. Each flower head contains eight to twelve individual flowers, with amber-colored styles topped by blackish purple pollen presenters and grey silky perianth lobes. It is endemic to the Fynbos ecoregion of South Africa, being confined to the Kogelberg mountain range. The mace pagoda was twice presumed extinct, but reappeared in its natural habitat from seed, after a wildfire several decades later.

== Description ==
Mimetes stokoei is an evergreen, upright, slender, column-like, mostly unbranched shrub of 1–2 m (3–6 1/2 ft) high, with the main stem up to 2 1/2 cm (1 in) thick at ground level. In the upper part it may sometimes have up to three, felty hairy branches 1/2–3/4 cm (0.2–0.3 in) thick. The pointed, ovate or broadly oval leaves are set alternately along the branches, at an upward angle and somewhat overlapping, and lack both stipules and petioles. They are 5–8 cm (2.0–3.2 in) long and 2 1/2–4 cm (1.0–1.6 in) wide, silvery due to a dense layer of silky hairs, have a slightly heart-shaped base, and an entire margin with a prominent tooth at the tip, seconded by two smaller teeth.

The inflorescences are set just below the top of the branches; they are broadly cylinder-shaped, 10–15 cm (4–6 in) high, and topped by a flattened crest of smallish, horizontal, pinkish-purple tinged leaves. It consists of several flowerheads in the axils of golden yellow leaves with a pinkish-purple wash during flowering, at a moderate upward angle that form a hood shielding the underlying flower head. Each flowerhead contains eight to twelve individual flowers. The outer whorl of involucral bracts, that encircle the flower heads, are oval to rounded, 1–1 2/3 cm (0.4–0.6 in) long and 3/4–1 1/2 cm (0.3–0.6 in) wide. The bracts on the inside of the head are oblong or bluntly line-shaped, 1 1/2–2 cm (0.6–0.8 in) long and 3–8 mm (0.12–0.32 in) wide. All have some silky hair on the outer surface and a dense row of equal length, silky hairs along its rim.

The bract subtending each flower is line-shaped or long spoon-shaped with a blunt tip, 1 1/2–1 3/4 cm (0.6–0.7 in) long and 2–3 mm (0.08–0.12 in) wide, and covered in dense soft matted hairs. The 4-merous perianth is 3 1/2–4 1/2 cm (1.4–1.8 in) long. The lower part, a tube, that remains merged when the flower is open, is about 5 mm (0.2 in) long, square in cross-section, hairless at the base becoming felty at the top. The four segments in the middle part (or claws), are thread- to line-shaped and densely felty. The segments in the upper part (or limbs), which enclosed the pollen presenter in the bud, are difficult to distinguish from the claws, threat- to line-shaped with a pointy tip, felty and 6–8 mm (¼–⅓ in) long. The four anthers lack a filament and are directly connected to the limbs, with black connecting tissue at the tip broadly arrow- to spade-shaped. From the centre of the perianth emerges a style of 5–6 1/2 cm (2.0–2.4 in) long. The thickened part at the tip of the style called pollen presenter is inverted cone-shaped with ring at its base, and a narrower neck, and a pointy pappilus at its tip that has a groove that functions as the stigma across the tip. The 1–2 mm (0.04–0.08 in) long ovary is difficult to distinguish from the style, and is subtended by four pointy, line-shaped scales of about 3 mm (0.12 in) long.

=== Differences with related species ===
The mace pagoda can be distinguished from other Mimetes species by its monopodial, columnar habit, the silver-haired oval leaves, with a large tooth in the middle and two smaller teeth, and the rounded bracts of the involucre.

== Taxonomy ==
As far as known, the mace pagoda was first collected by Thomas Pearson Stokoe, who found just a single specimen somewhere in the Kogelberg mountains above Kleinmond in February 1922. He sent it to the herbarium at Kew in London, where it was described by Edwin Percy Phillips and John Hutchinson, naming it after its collector M. stokoei in 1922.

== Distribution and habitat ==
M. stokoei is endemic to the Kogelberg Nature Reserve, Western Cape province of South Africa, where it only occurs in one location on the Paardeberg, in the upper reaches of the Palmiet river near Kleinmond. It grows on a gentle slope of weathered Table Mountain Sandstone that is dry in the summer and wet during the winter at an altitude of 560–600 m (1,840–1,970 ft).

The species is fast growing and relatively short-lived. Specimens were observed to start flowering at an age of around four years. Apparently, it is present in the soil seed bank for decades, until a suitably intense fire triggers germination. Flower heads may develop at any time during the year. It is assumed that like other Mimetes species, the mace pagoda is pollinated by birds and the seeds are distributed by ants.

== Conservation ==
Following his initial find, Stokoe tried to locate further specimens, but failed to do so until he spotted it in one of the buckets of a female wild flower vendor on Adderley Street Flower Market, Cape Town, in 1925. After much persuasion, the lady guided him to a small stand of this species. At that time, these were already aged plants. In 1959 all plants in this location had died, and as no other population was known, the species was presumed extinct. In an effort to make better use of the horticultural potential and curb the general deterioration of the Cape flora, Oudenbos, a farm to experiment with growing Proteaceae, was established in 1964 in the upper Palmiet River Valley. Some of the terrain was burned to clear the natural vegetation. In 1965 a rogue seedling was discovered on the edge of a planthole, that was identified as a mace pagoda. The plant snapped on a plant support during a storm, and again M. stokoei had apparently died out. The location was given up when in 1973 another experimental farm was started. In 1999 a particularly intense wildfire swept the upper Palmiet Valley, and in January 2001 twenty four silvery seedlings of the mace pagoda were found. These plants started flowering in 2005 and blooming reached a peak in 2007. By 2009 only five plants were still alive. In 2011 a new, less intense fire destroyed the remaining plants. The continued survival is somewhat less threatened since horticulturalists have succeeded in grafting cuttings of the mace pagoda on the rootstock of Leucospermum hypophyllocarpodendron.

The mace pagoda is considered critically endangered due to its minute distribution area of only 10 m^{2} (110 sq ft) and its small, fluctuating population. The species was probably threatened by the collection of flowers in the wild. Current threats include too high frequency wildfires and the root disease Phytophthora.
