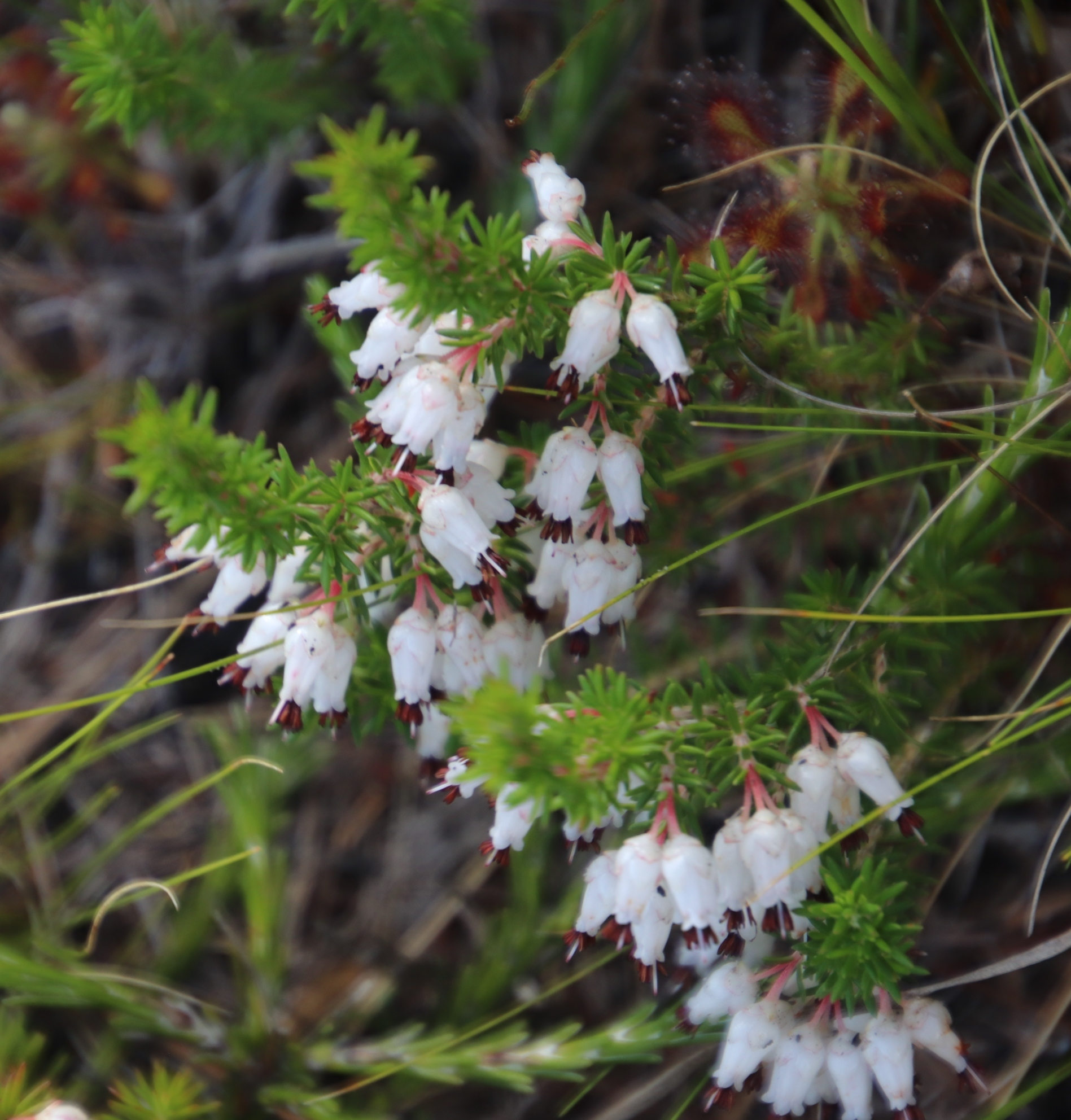

Scientific classification
- Kingdom: Plantae
- Clade: Tracheophytes
- Clade: Angiosperms
- Clade: Eudicots
- Clade: Asterids
- Order: Ericales
- Family: Ericaceae
- Genus: Erica
- Species: E. desmantha

Binomial name
- Erica desmantha Benth.

Synonyms
- Ericoides desmanthum (Benth.) Kuntze

= Erica desmantha =

Species of flowering plant

Erica desmantha is a plant belonging to the genus Erica and forming part of the fynbos. The species is endemic to the Western Cape.

The species has two varieties:

- Erica desmantha var. desmantha
- Erica desmantha var. urceolata H.A.Baker
