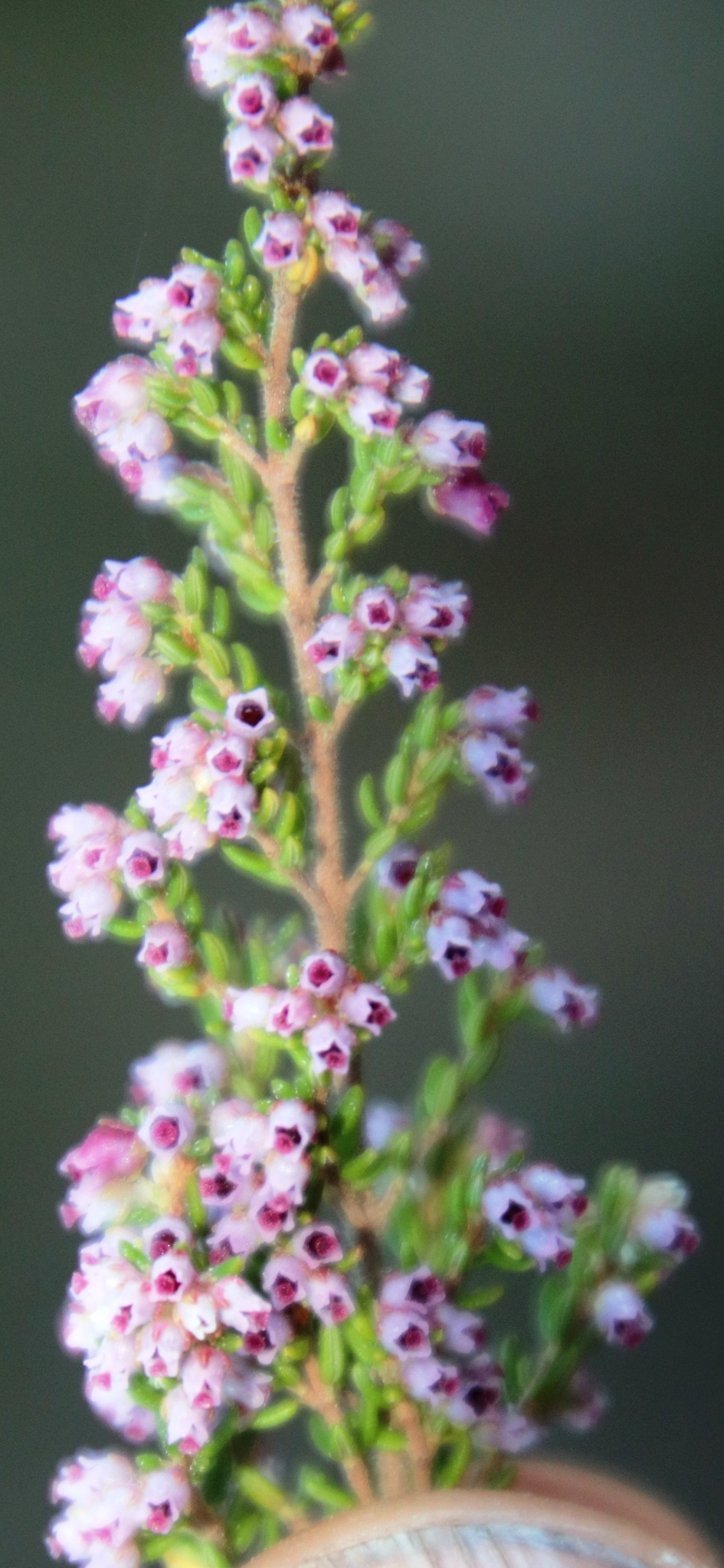

Scientific classification
- Kingdom: Plantae
- Clade: Tracheophytes
- Clade: Angiosperms
- Clade: Eudicots
- Clade: Asterids
- Order: Ericales
- Family: Ericaceae
- Genus: Erica
- Species: E. hispidula

Binomial name
- Erica hispidula L., (1763)

Synonyms
- Ceramia serpyllifolia G.Don; Erica absinthoides L.; Erica approximata Schltdl. ex Spreng.; Erica colleter Spreng.; Erica foliacea Klotzsch ex Benth.; Erica galioides Klotzsch ex Benth.; Erica hispida Thunb.; Erica inops Bolus; Erica minuta Klotzsch ex Benth.; Erica virgata Thunb.; Erica virgularis Salisb.; Ericoides hispidulum (L.) Kuntze

= Erica hispidula =

Species of flowering plant

Erica hispidula is a plant that belongs to the genus Erica and forms part of the fynbos. The species is endemic to the Western Cape.
