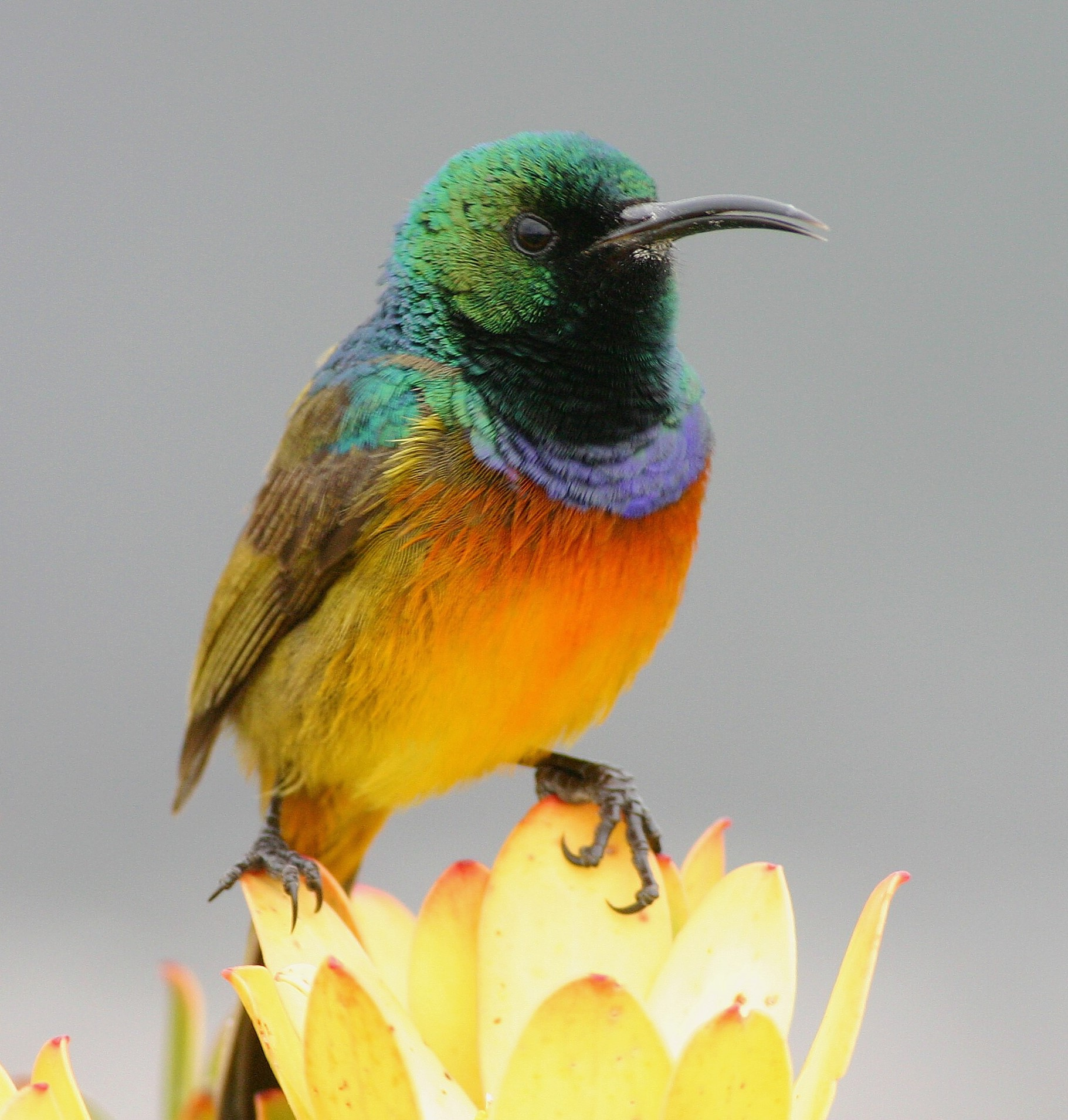
- Male perched on a Leucadendron plant

Conservation status
- Least Concern (IUCN 3.1)

Scientific classification
- Kingdom: Animalia
- Phylum: Chordata
- Class: Aves
- Order: Passeriformes
- Family: Nectariniidae
- Genus: Anthobaphes; Cabanis, 1851
- Species: A. violacea

Binomial name
- Anthobaphes violacea (Linnaeus, 1766)

Synonyms
- Certhia violacea Linnaeus, 1766; Nectarinia violacea (Linnaeus, 1766)

= Orange-breasted sunbird =

Species of bird

The orange-breasted sunbird (Anthobaphes violacea) is a species of small, predominantly nectar-feeding bird that is endemic to the fynbos shrubland biome of southwestern South Africa. It is the only member of the genus Anthobaphes, in the family Nectariniidae (the sunbirds and spiderhunters), though it is sometimes placed in the genus Nectarinia. The birds are sexually dimorphic, with females being olive green while the males are orange to yellow on the underside with bright green, blue and purple on the head and neck.

== Taxonomy ==
In 1760 the French zoologist Mathurin Jacques Brisson included a description of the orange-breasted sunbird in his Ornithologie, based on a specimen collected from the Cape of Good Hope. He used the French name Le petit grimpereau a longue queue du Cap de Bonne Espérance and the Latin Certhia Longicauda Minor Capitis Bonae Spei. Although Brisson coined Latin names, these do not conform to the binomial system and are not recognised by the International Commission on Zoological Nomenclature. When in 1766 the Swedish naturalist Carl Linnaeus updated his Systema Naturae for the twelfth edition, he added 240 species that had been previously described by Brisson. One of these was the orange-breasted sunbird. Linnaeus included a brief description, coined the binomial name Certhia violacea and cited Brisson's work. This species is now the only member of the genus Anthobaphes that was introduced by the German ornithologists Jean Cabanis in 1850. The name is from the Ancient Greek anthobaphēs ('bright-coloured') derived from ανθός (anthós, 'flower') and βᾰφή (băphḗ, 'dyeing').

== Description ==
As with other sunbirds the bill is long and decurved, that of the male being longer than that of the female. The bill, legs and feet are black. The eyes are dark brown. The head, throat and mantle of the male are bright metallic green. The rest of the upper parts are olive green. The upper breast is metallic violet and the lower breast is bright orange, fading to paler orange and yellow on the belly. The tail is long and blackish, with elongated central tail feathers, which extend beyond the other feathers. The female has olive-greenish grey upperparts and olive yellowish underparts, paler on the belly. The wings and tail are blackish. The juvenile resembles the female.

The birds' call is a twangy, weak ssharaynk or sskrang, often repeated several times.

== Distribution and habitat ==
Due to its restricted range within the fynbos biome of South Africa's Western Cape, this sunbird is associated with ericas and proteas. It breeds when the heath flowers, typically in May. The male defends its territory aggressively, attacking and chasing intruders.

This tame species is a common breeder across its limited range, and is an altitudinal migrant, moving to higher altitudes during the southern summer in search of flowers. It is gregarious when not breeding, forming flocks of up to 100 birds.

== Behaviour ==
=== Breeding ===
The orange-breasted sunbird breeds from February to November (mainly in May–August). The nest, built mainly by the female, is an oval of rootlets, fine leafy twigs and grass, bound together with spider webs and lined with brown protea fluff. It has a side top entrance, but does not have a covered porch. The usual clutch is two eggs and the female alone incubates. The eggs hatch in about 14.5 days and both parents feed the young. The young birds are mostly fed with insect and spider prey.

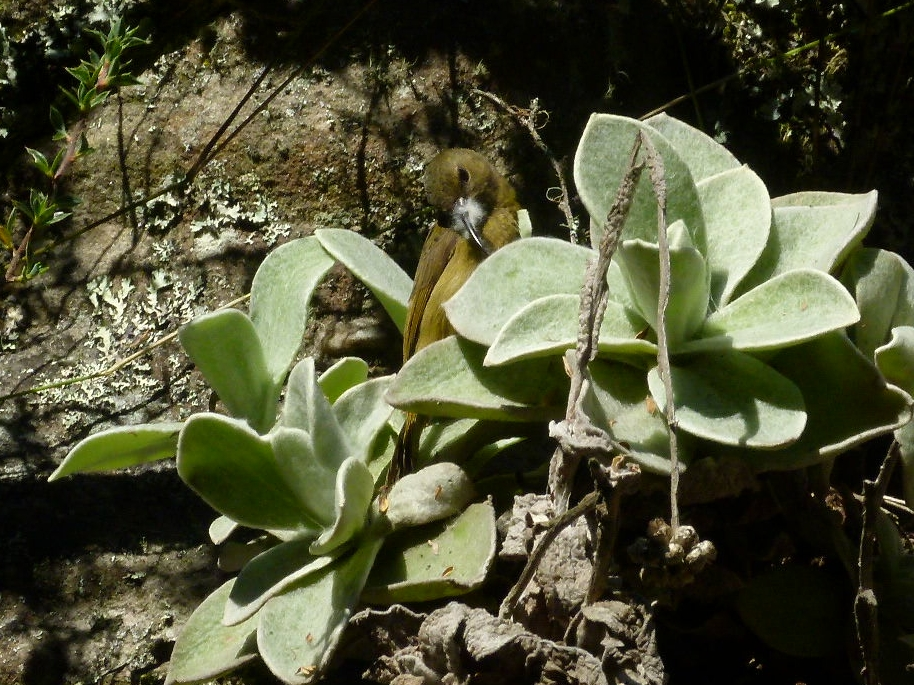
Female collecting leaf hairs to line nest

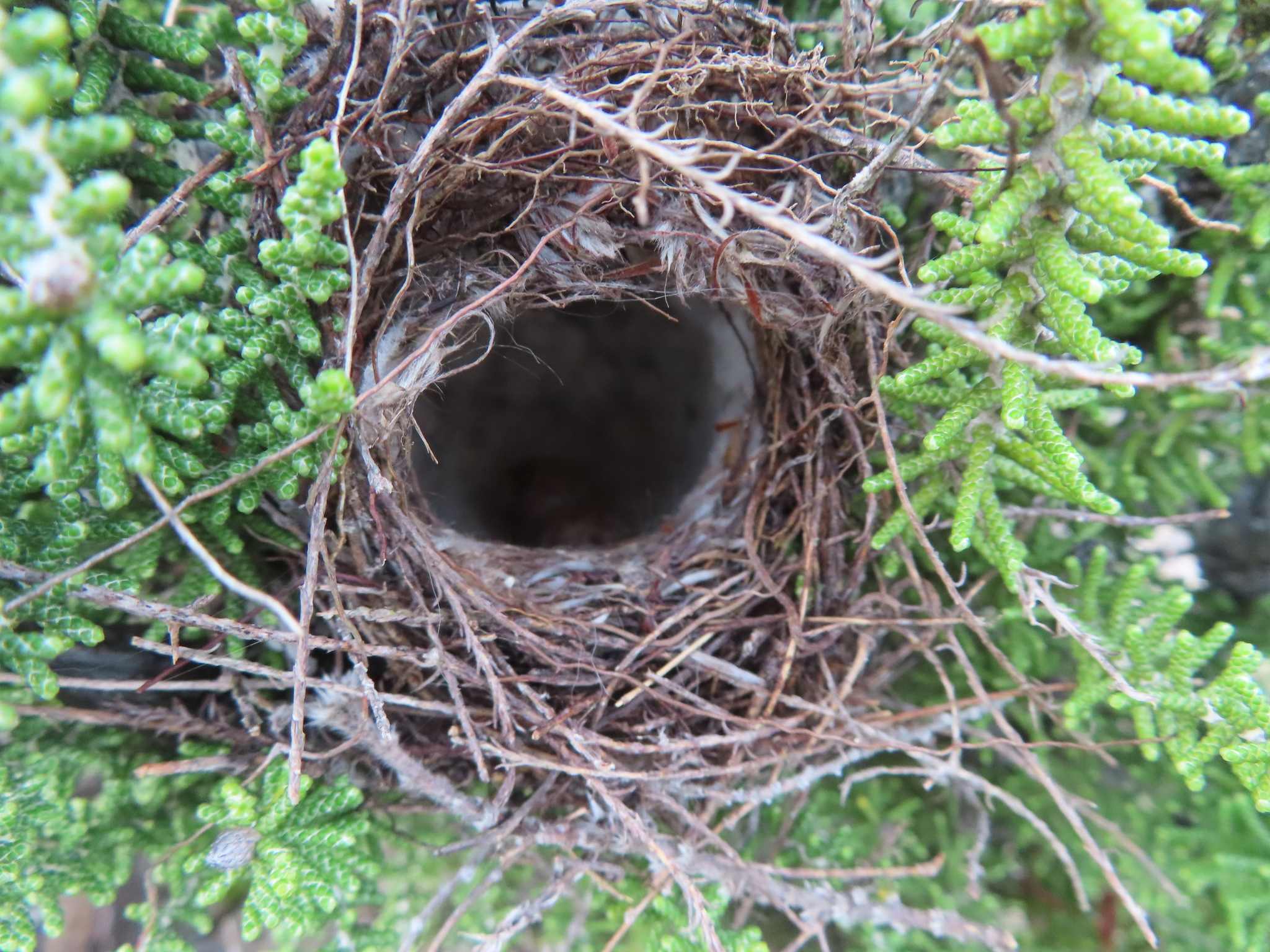
Nest placed in fynbos at Rooiels

=== Food and feeding ===
The orange-breasted sunbird subsists on flower nectar, predominantly from ericas and proteas, although it will make use of other types of flowering plants as well. It will also take small insects and spiders, often in flight.

== Ecology ==
Orange-breasted sunbirds are known to pollinate Protea, Leucospermum, and Erica species, the flowers of which they visit for nectar. They perch on the ground to visit the low flowers of Hyobanche sanguinea and Lachenalia luteola. They also indulge in nectar theft from flowers with longer corolla tubes such as Chasmanthe floribunda. Being fire-prone, the fynbos habitat ensures a great amount of mobility of the birds, which may have contributed to a greater level of individual genetic variability despite having a rather limited distribution range.

A number of plasmodia-like blood parasites are known from the orange-breasted sunbirds.

== Conservation status ==
This species is currently classified as Least Concern by the IUCN. It may however be adversely affected by urbanisation, habitat conversion to agriculture, and fynbos fires.
