= Edwin Percy Phillips =

South African botanist and taxonomist

Edwin Percy Phillips

Edwin Percy Phillips (18 February 1884 – 12 April 1967) was a South African botanist and taxonomist, noted for his monumental work The Genera of South African Flowering Plants first published in 1926.

Phillips was born in Sea Point, Cape Town, and attended the South African College, which later became the University of Cape Town, where he graduated under Prof. Henry Harold Welch Pearson, obtaining a BA in 1903, an MA in 1908 and a DSc in 1915 for a treatise on the flora of the Leribe Plateau in Lesotho.

He was the son of Ralph Edwards Phillips and Edith Minnie Crowder. He married Edith Isabel Dawson about 1912 and they had two daughters before her death c. 1948. He secondly married Susan Kriel c. 1949. Phillips named the genus Susanna belonging to the family Asteraceae after her. He died in Cape Town.

== Timeline of career ==
- 1907 Herbarium assistant at South African Museum (Prof. Pearson honorary curator)
- 1910 Royal Botanic Gardens, Kew - with Otto Stapf and John Hutchinson described Proteaceae for Flora Capensis.
- 1911 Curator of South African Museum Herbarium, succeeding Pearson who moved to the Bolus Herbarium
- 1911 Joined Percy Sladen Memorial Expedition to the Kamiesberge
- 1913 Field work on Leribe Plateau in Lesotho published in Ann. S.Afr. Mus. 16:1-379(1917)
- 1918 Curator of National Herbarium, Pretoria
- 1926 Botanical Survey Memoir No. 10 - The Genera of South African Flowering Plants arranged according to Dalla Torre & Harms.
- 1931 "South African Grasses"
- 1939 "The Weeds of South Africa"
- 1939-44 Chief of the Division of Botany and Plant Pathology, succeeding I. B. Pole-Evans
- 1944 Edited Christo Albertyn Smith and Estelle Van Hoepen's The Common Names of South African Plants
- 1951 Second edition of The Genera of South African Flowering Plants

=== Awards, honours and memberships ===
- Fellow of the Linnean Society of London
- Fellow of the Royal Society of South Africa
- Carnegie Travelling Scholarship to US and Canada in 1934
- Secretary SA Biological Society 1919-44, President in 1925, Senior Capt. Scott Medal
- Council of SA Association for the Advancement of Science, President in 1942
- SA Medal 1935
- Scientific Liaison Officer for the C.S.I.R. in Washington, DC 1946-48
- Secretary of Mountain Club of South Africa
- Leucadendron phillipsii Hutch.
- Agathosma phillipsii Dümmer
- Vol. 25 of Flowering Plants of Africa dedicated to him

=== Selected works ===
- A Contribution to the Knowledge of the South African Proteaceae - 1913
- Contributions to the Flora of South Africa - 1913
- Descriptions of New Plants from the Gift Berg collected by the Percy Sladen Memorial Expedition - 1913
- A list of the Phanerogams and Ferns collected by Mr. P.C. Keytel on the Island of Tristan da Cunha, 1908-1909 - 1913
- A note on the Flora of the Great Winterhoek Range (South African Journal of Science) - 1918
- A Preliminary List of the Known Poisonous Plants found in South Africa (Botanical Survey of South Africa. Memoir) - 1926
- An Introduction to the Study of the South African Grasses: With notes on their structure, distribution, cultivation, etc. (South African agricultural series) - 1931
- Life and Living: A story for children - 1933
- Civilization and our Biological Past
- Herbaria and Botanical Institutions in the United States of America and Canada: In relation to similar institutions in South Africa : report on a visit ... of the Carnegie Corporation of New York - 1935
- The Advancement of Science - 1943
- The Genera of South African Flowering Plants (Botanical Survey Memoir) - 1951
