= John Patrick Rourke =

(b.1942) South African botanist

- Born: 26 March 1942 (age 84); Cape Town
- Known for: Cape Flora, Proteaceae
- Scientific career
- Fields: Botany
- Workplaces: Kirstenbosch National Botanical Garden and Compton Herbarium
- Author abbrev. (botany): Rourke

John Patrick Rourke FMLS (born 26 March 1942 in Cape Town) is a South African botanist, who worked at the Kirstenbosch National Botanical Garden and became curator of the Compton Herbarium. He is a specialist in the flora of the Cape Floristic Region, in particular the family Proteaceae.

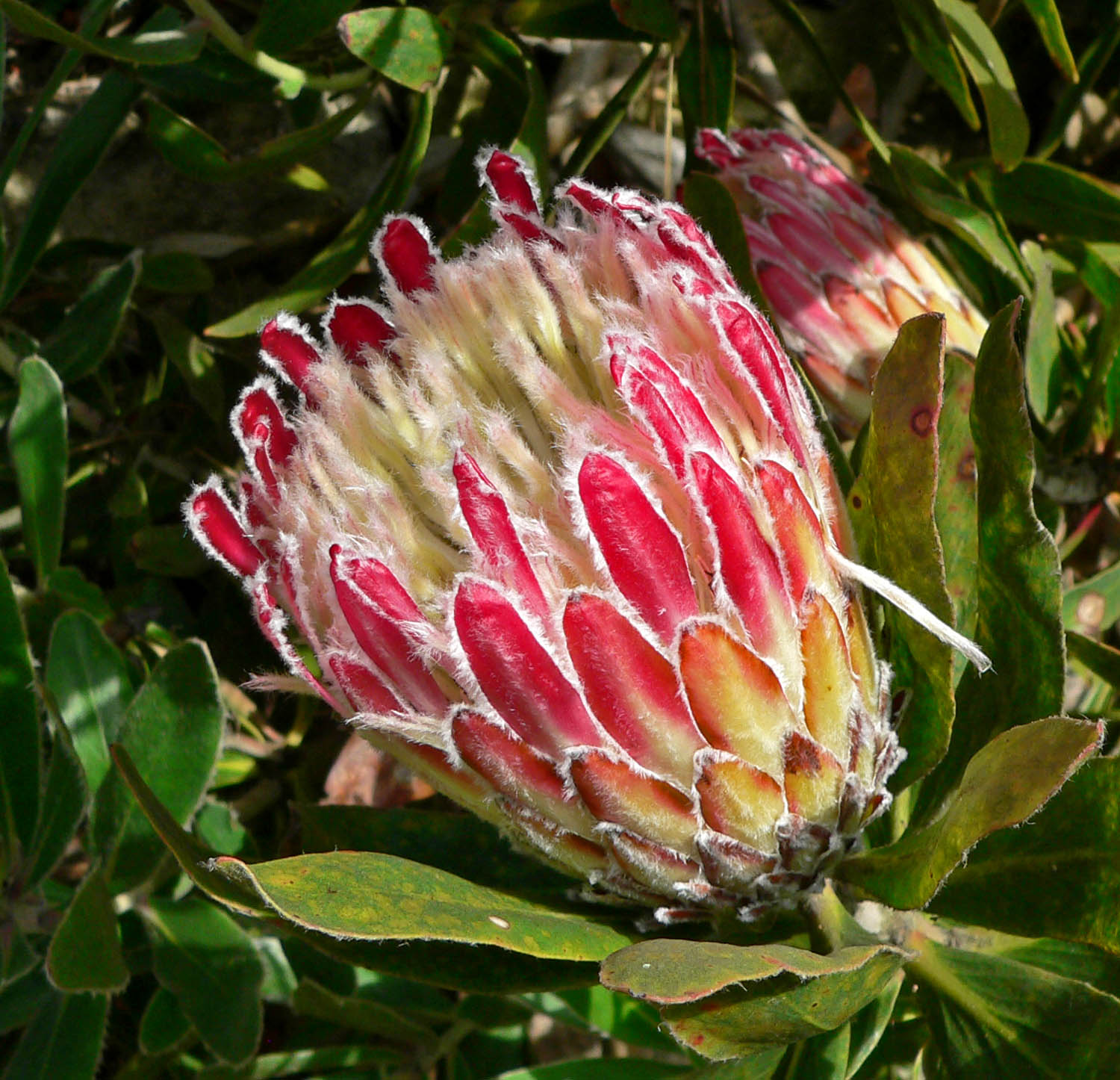
Protea obtusifolia

== Career ==
Rourke studied at the University of Cape Town from 1960 to 1970, where he obtained his B.Sc., M.Sc. and Ph.D. He started working at Kirstenbosch in 1966, and succeeded Winsome Fanny Barker as curator of the Compton Herbarium in 1972. He published several revisions of Proteacean genera including Leucadendron, Leucospermum, Mimetes, Vexatorella, Sorocephalus and Spatalla.

During his career he collected approximately 2000 specimens of flora from the southwestern and southern Cape, Namaqualand and eastern Transvaal.

In 1997 he was made foreign member of the Linnean Society of London. In 2003 Rourke was awarded the "Gold medal for Lifetime Preservation of the Environment" by The Cape Tercentenary Foundation.

== Eponyms ==
Several plant species were named in his honour including:

- Cleretum rourkei
- Grubbia rourkei
- Watsonia rourkei
- Leucadendron rourkei
- Galium rourkei
- Acmadenia rourkeana
- Diosma rourkei
- Thesmophora scopulosa Rourke

The standard author abbreviation Rourke is used to indicate this person as the author when citing a botanical name.

== Selected publications ==
- 1997 Rourke, J.P. Wild Flowers of South Africa, Struik Publishers, ISBN 978-1-86825-897-0
- 1982 Rourke, J.P.; Anderson, F.; Ripley, L. The Proteas of Southern Africa, Centaur Press, ISBN 978-0-908379-10-1
- 1972. Taxonomic Studies on Leucospermum R.Br.: J. of South African Botany 8: Additional Vol. 194 pp.
- 1969. Taxonomic Studies on Sorocephalus R.Br.: J. of South African Botany 7: Additional Vol. 124 pp.
