= Pollen-presenter =

Structure found in some flowers

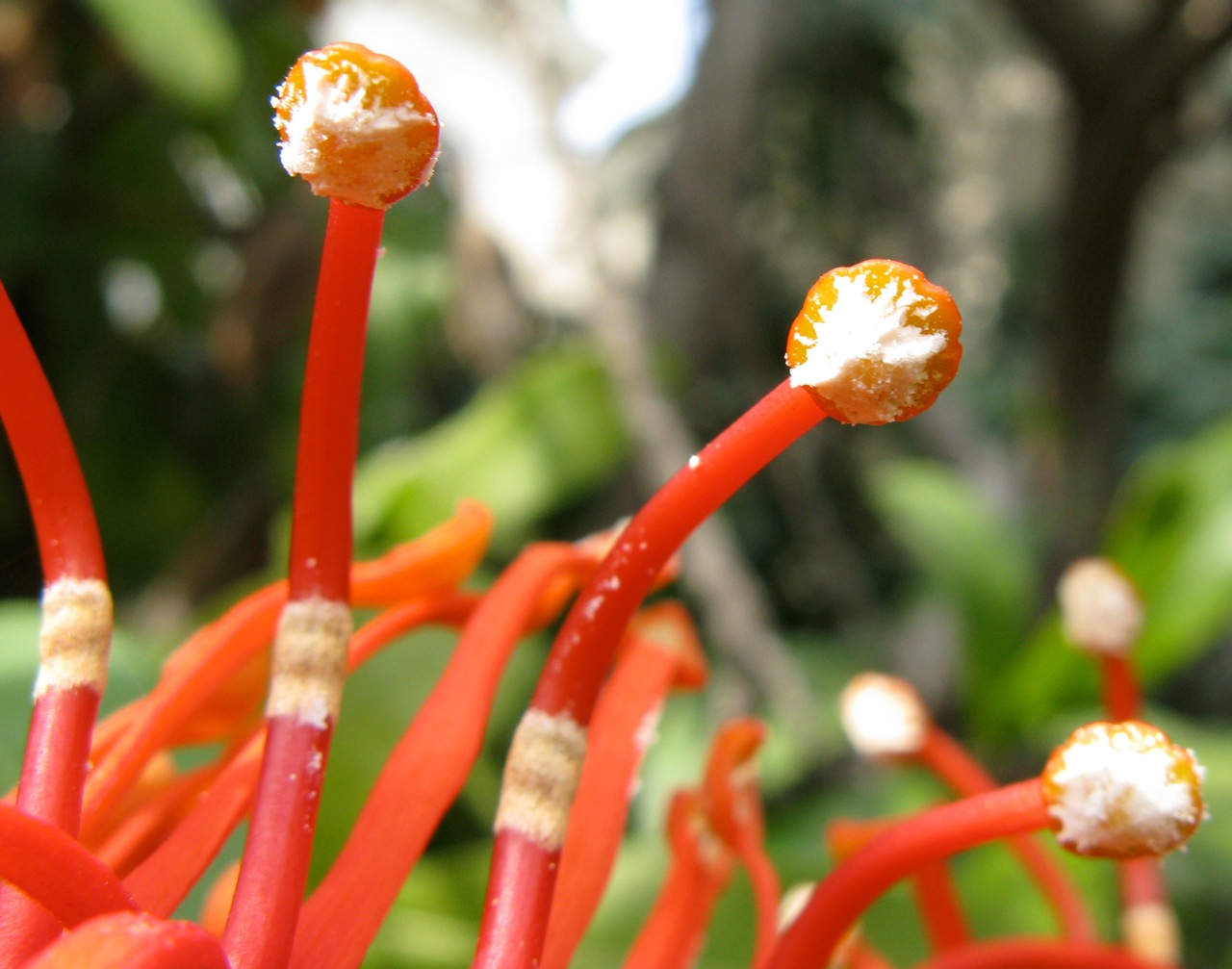
Stenocarpus sinuatus, pollen presenters

A pollen-presenter is an area on the tip of the style in flowers of plants of the family Proteaceae on which the anthers release their pollen prior to anthesis. To ensure pollination, the style grows during anthesis, sticking out the pollen-presenter prominently, and so ensuring that the pollen easily contacts the bodies of potential pollination vectors such as bees, birds and nectarivorous mammals. The systematic deposition of pollen on the tip of the style implies the plants have some strategy to avoid excessive self-pollination.
