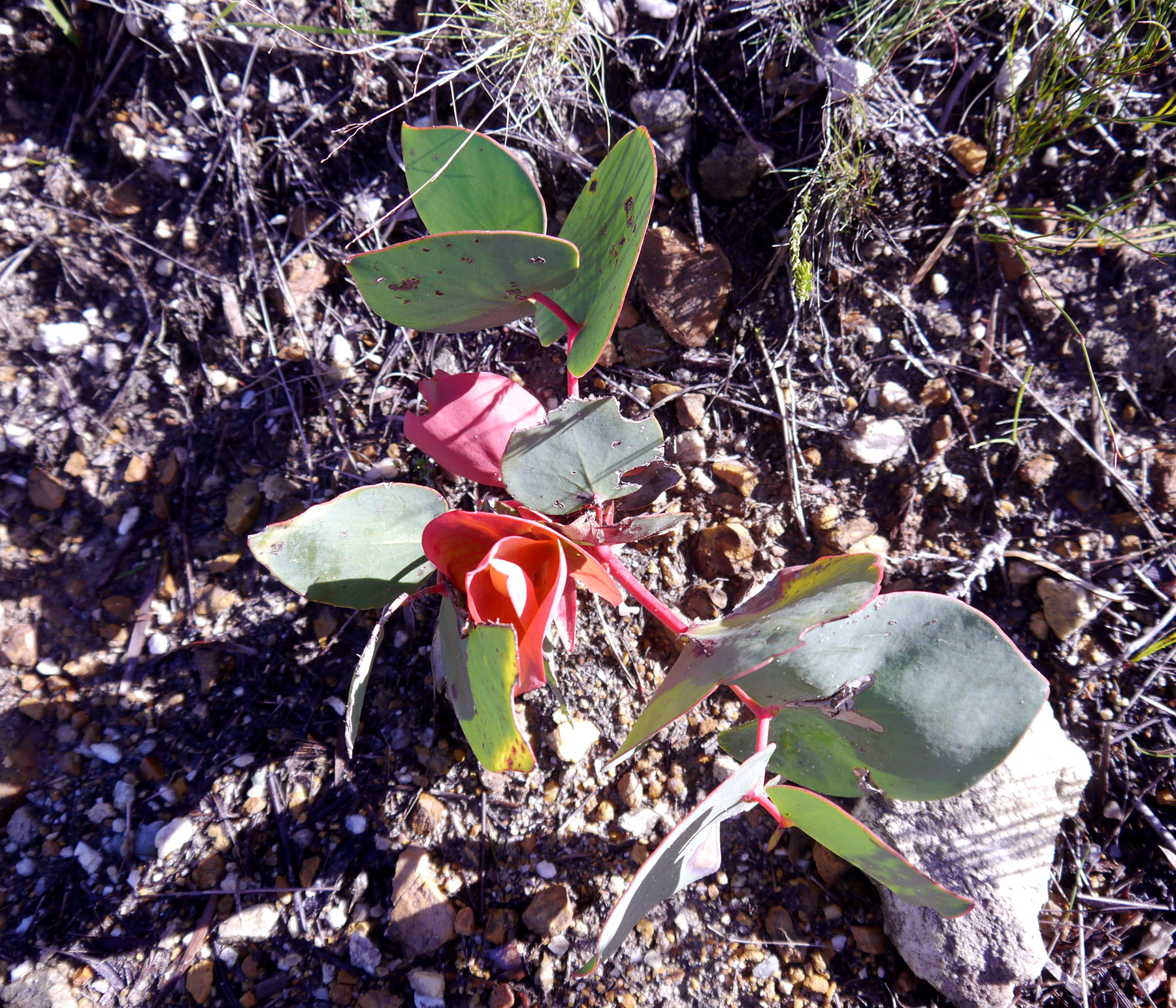

Conservation status
- Near Threatened (IUCN 3.1)

Scientific classification
- Kingdom: Plantae
- Clade: Tracheophytes
- Clade: Angiosperms
- Clade: Eudicots
- Order: Proteales
- Family: Proteaceae
- Genus: Protea
- Species: P. cordata

Binomial name
- Protea cordata Thunb.

= Protea cordata =

Species of plant

Protea cordata (heart-leaf sugarbush; hartblaarsuikerbos (Afr.)) is a plant species native to Southern Africa that grows on woody soils or in the soil.

The red, bald-sheared trunk is unbranched and reaches a length of 500 mm. Brown, lance-shaped, scaly leaves appear at the base of the stem, and some stalkless, heart-shaped leaves zigzag along the tip, while others gradually shrink.

Small mammals and insects have been found to contribute to the reproduction and distribution of the Protea cordata, as it has been determined to be a self-incompatible species.

Brown dry paper bracts form a cup – shape that surrounds a cream – colored flower with red tip, with an orange-brown flower at the base of the flower. A new trunk grows from the woody subsoil, while the old one dies after one or two years and is finally blown away. Each reversed fruit contains a single seed and is covered by a thick layer of green, brown or orange-brown leaves, covered with a thin, white, upturned, yellow, green or yellowish orange fruit.
