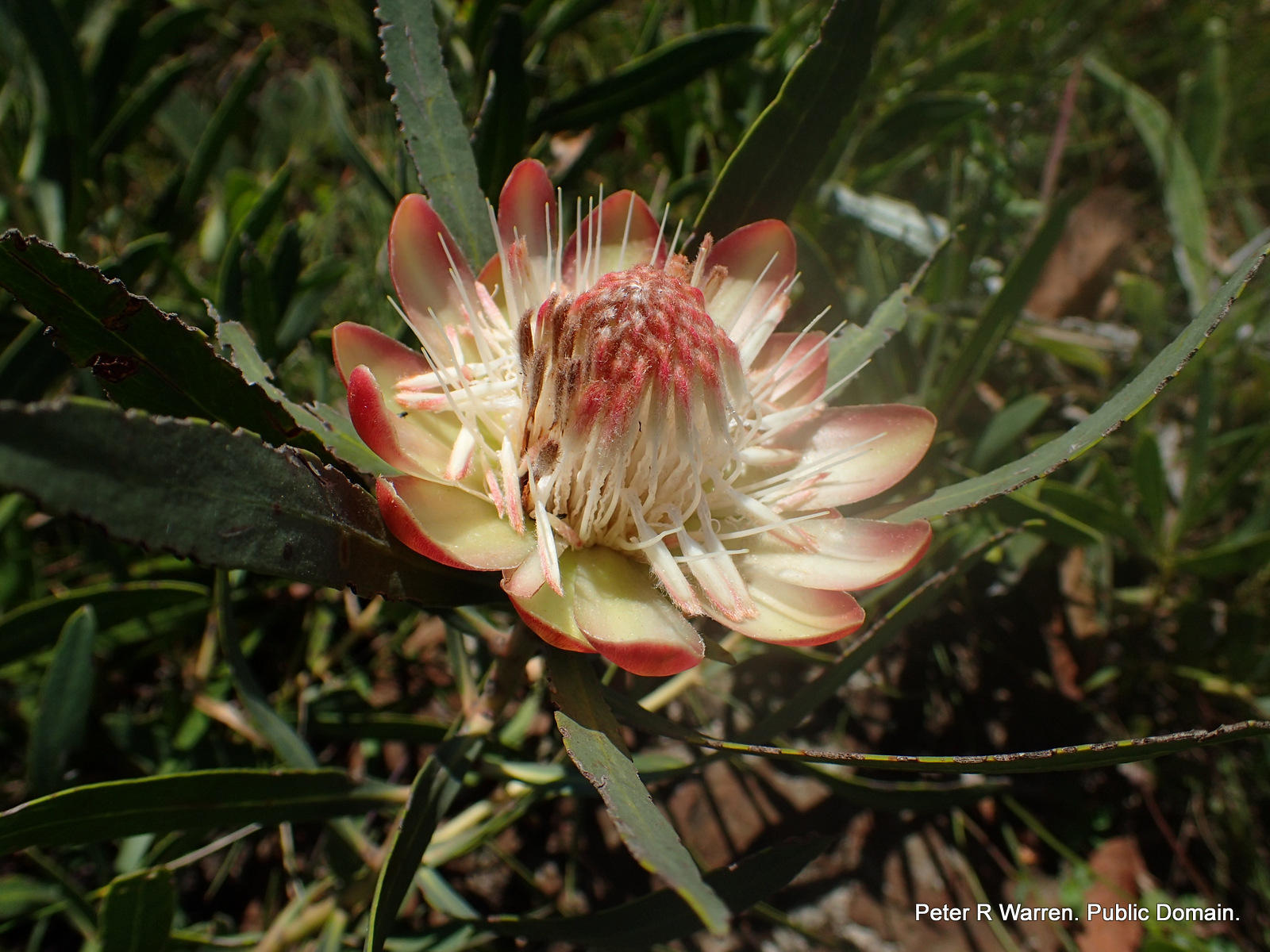

Conservation status
- Least Concern (IUCN 3.1)

Scientific classification
- Kingdom: Plantae
- Clade: Tracheophytes
- Clade: Angiosperms
- Clade: Eudicots
- Order: Proteales
- Family: Proteaceae
- Genus: Protea
- Species: P. simplex

Binomial name
- Protea simplex E.Phillips

= Protea simplex =

Species of plant

Protea simplex, the dwarf grassveld sugarbush, is a flower-bearing shrub belonging to the genus Protea. It is native to South Africa.

In Afrikaans, it is known as slanksuikerbos.

== Description ==
The plant is small, flattened, and grows 16 cm (6.3 in) in diameter. It flowers from December to March. The plant sprouts again after it has burned. The seeds are stored in a shell, released after 9–12 months and spread by the wind. The plant is unisexual. Pollination takes place through the action of birds.

== Distribution and habitat ==
The plant occurs on the escarpment of the Drakensberg from Mariepskop through Mpumalanga and Eswatini to Vryheid in KwaZulu-Natal. The plant grows rotas-like, open grasslands in acid soil at altitudes of 1,300–2,150 m (4,270–7,050 ft).
