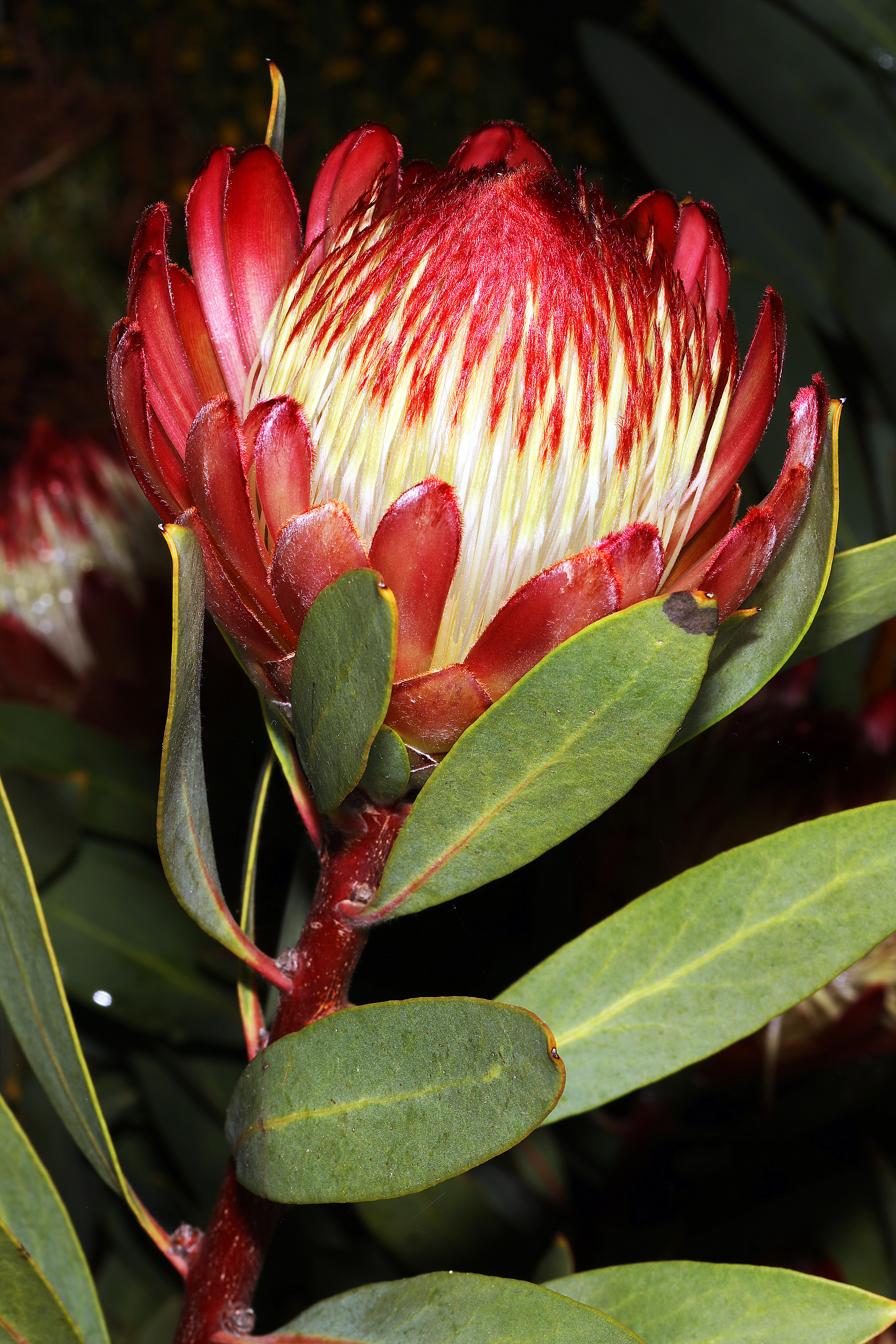

Conservation status
- Least Concern (IUCN 3.1)

Scientific classification
- Kingdom: Plantae
- Clade: Tracheophytes
- Clade: Angiosperms
- Clade: Eudicots
- Order: Proteales
- Family: Proteaceae
- Genus: Protea
- Species: P. glabra

Binomial name
- Protea glabra (R.Br.) Kuntze

Synonyms
- Leucadendron glabra R.Br.

= Protea glabra =

Species of flowering shrub

Protea glabra, also called the Clanwilliam sugarbush, is a flowering shrub belonging to the genus Protea.

Other vernacular names for this plant are chestnut sugarbush, Clanwilliam protea or kayang bush. In Afrikaans it is known as the kaiingbos, kaiing-suikerbos, kaiinghout, kayangbos, kreupelwaboom or tolletjiewaboom.

The tree's national number is 89.1.

== Description ==
The bush grows up to 5m high and has a conical shape. It blooms from July to November. The plant is monoecious with both sexes in each flower.

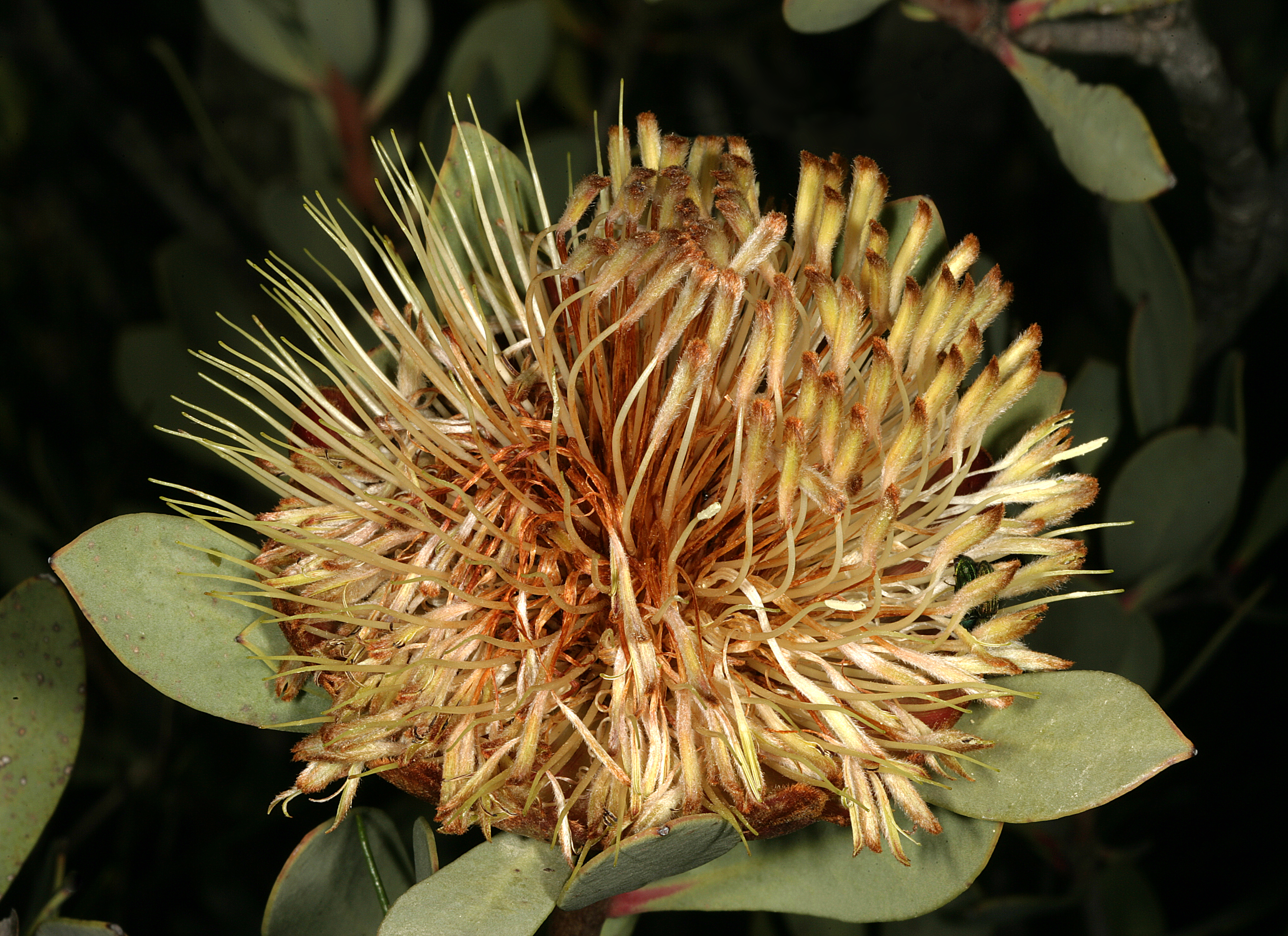
Inflorescence with open flowers at Farm Oorlogskloof, Nieuwoudtville, Northern Cape, South Africa

== Ecology ==
Pollination occurs through the action of birds and beetles. The seed is not stored in the woody fruit and is spread by the wind as soon as it is ripe. The plant grows in shallow sandstone soils or cracks in rock at altitudes of 500 - 1,500m. It is long-lived and can re-sprout after burning from a bole-shaped rootstock, although it normally grows in areas where there is low risk of wildfires.

== Distribution ==
This species is endemic to South Africa. The plant is found in the Western Cape, on the Bokkeveld escarpment up to the Olifants River and the Koue Bokkeveld Mountains. Here, it is a widespread and common species with no severe threats.
