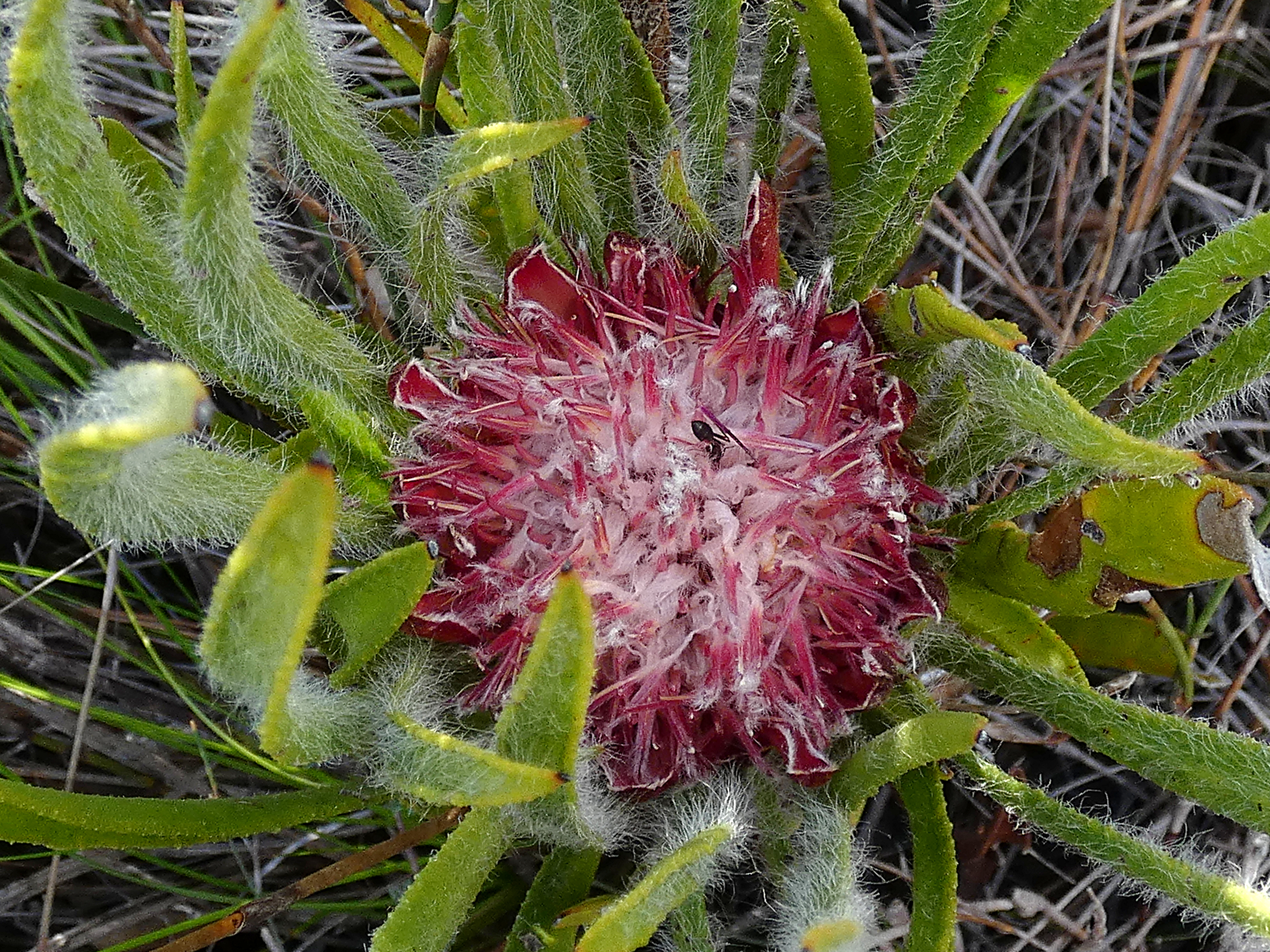

Conservation status
- Vulnerable (IUCN 3.1)

Scientific classification
- Kingdom: Plantae
- Clade: Embryophytes
- Clade: Tracheophytes
- Clade: Angiosperms
- Clade: Eudicots
- Order: Proteales
- Family: Proteaceae
- Genus: Protea
- Species: P. denticulata

Binomial name
- Protea denticulata Rourke

= Protea denticulata =

Species of flowering plant

Protea denticulata, commonly known as the tooth-leaf sugarbush, is a shrub of the family Proteaceae native to the southwestern Cape Provinces of South Africa. It can grow up to a meter tall.
