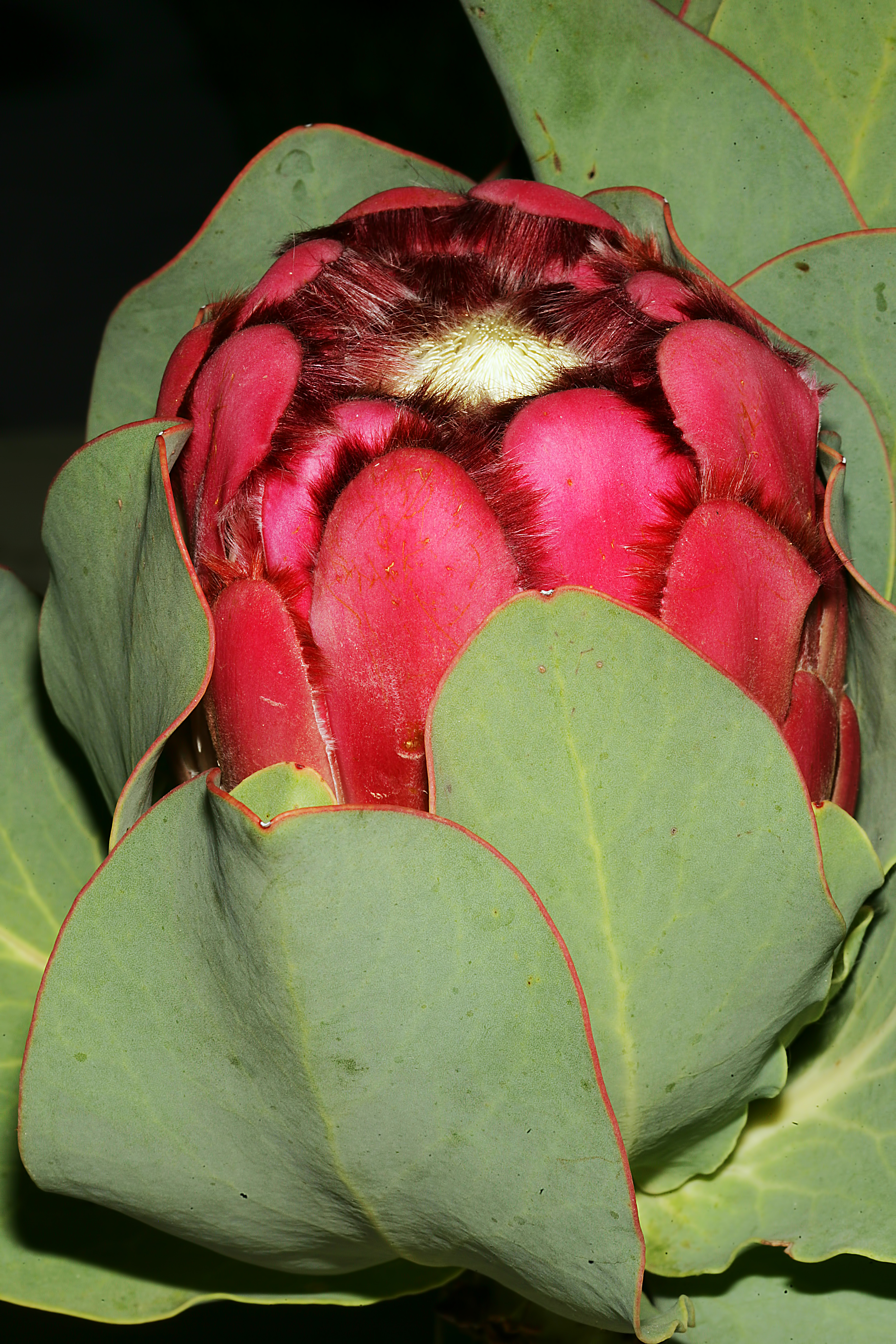

Conservation status
- Near Threatened (IUCN 3.1)

Scientific classification
- Kingdom: Plantae
- Clade: Embryophytes
- Clade: Tracheophytes
- Clade: Angiosperms
- Clade: Eudicots
- Order: Proteales
- Family: Proteaceae
- Genus: Protea
- Species: P. grandiceps

Binomial name
- Protea grandiceps Tratt.

= Protea grandiceps =

Species of flowering plant

Protea grandiceps, commonly known as rooisuikerbos, suikerbos or red sugarbush, is a flowering shrub that belongs to the Protea genus and is native to south western parts of South Africa. The shrub was listed as a near threatened species in 2006 according to the South African National Biodiversity Institute.

== Description ==
The shrub is round and grows 2 m (6 ft 7 in) high and blooms from September to January. Fire destroys the plant but the seeds survive. The seed is stored in a cap and spread by the wind. The plant is unisexual. Pollination occurs through the action of birds. The tree's national number is 89.2.

== Taxonomy ==
The species was first formally described by the botanist Leopold Trattinnick, the specific epithet means large head and is derived from the Latin words grandis meaning great or large and ceps meaning head in reference to the flower-heads.

== Distribution ==
The plant is endemic to South Africa and is found in the Cape Peninsula, Hottentots Holland Mountains, Riviersonderend Mountains, Langeberg, Outeniqua Mountains, Tsitsikamma Mountains, Winterhoek Mountains and Kamanassie Mountains where it is commonly situated on stony crevices on dry upper mountain slopes at elevations of 1,200 to 1,700 m (3,900 to 5,600 ft). It is spread over a total area of around 652 km^{2} (252 sq mi) composed of fragmented populations.
