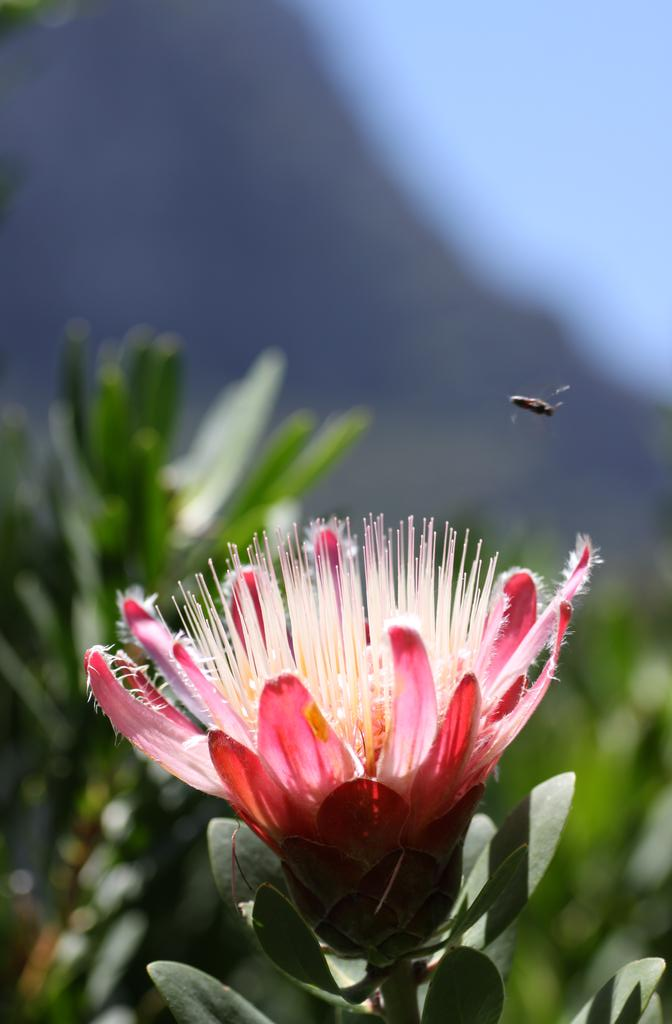

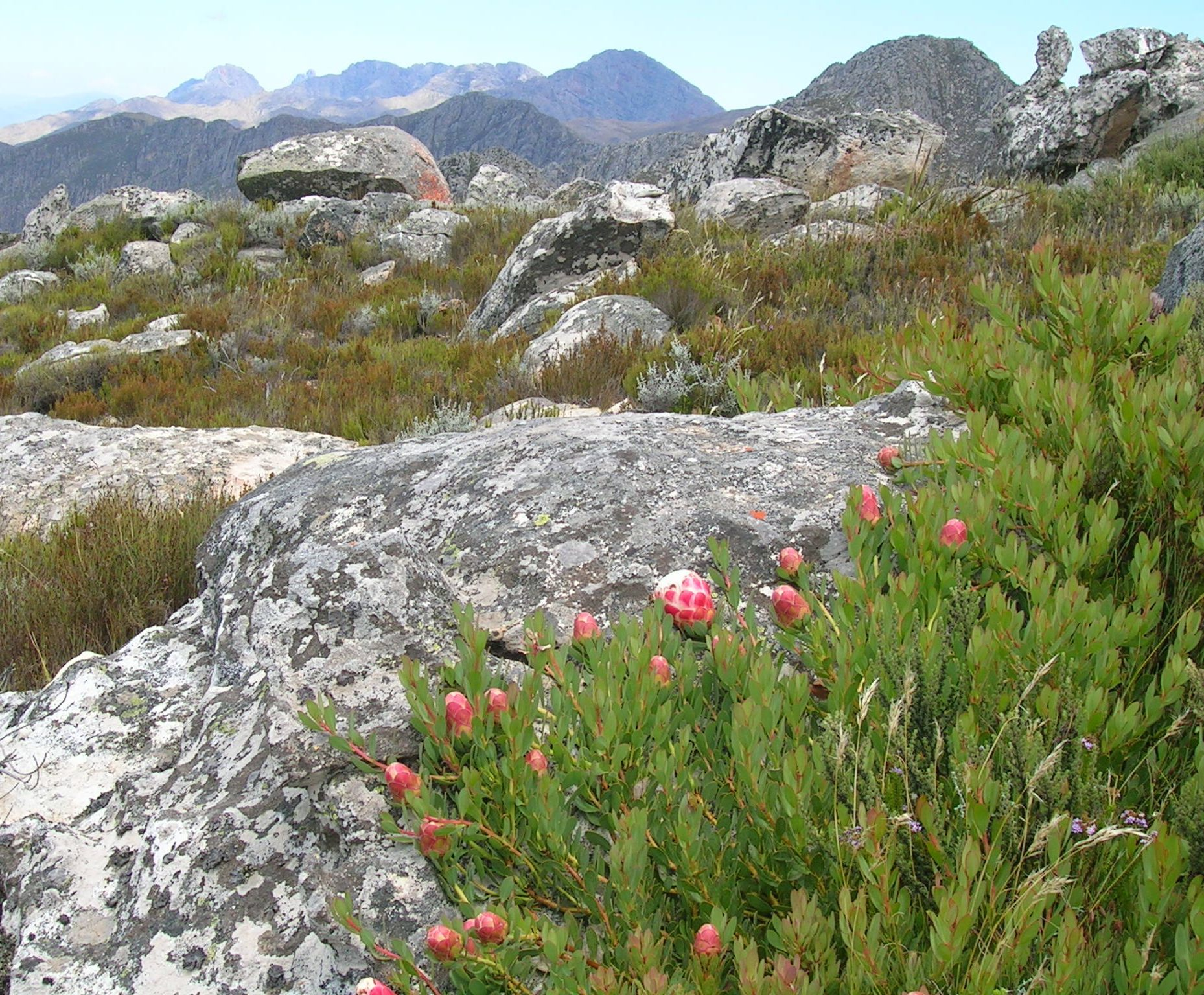

Conservation status
- Endangered (IUCN 3.1)

Scientific classification
- Kingdom: Plantae
- Clade: Tracheophytes
- Clade: Angiosperms
- Clade: Eudicots
- Order: Proteales
- Family: Proteaceae
- Genus: Protea
- Species: P. venusta

Binomial name
- Protea venusta Compton

= Protea venusta =

Species of flowering plant

Protea venusta, the cascade sugarbush or creeping beauty, is a flower-bearing shrub belonging to the genus Protea. It is endemic to South Africa.

== Description ==
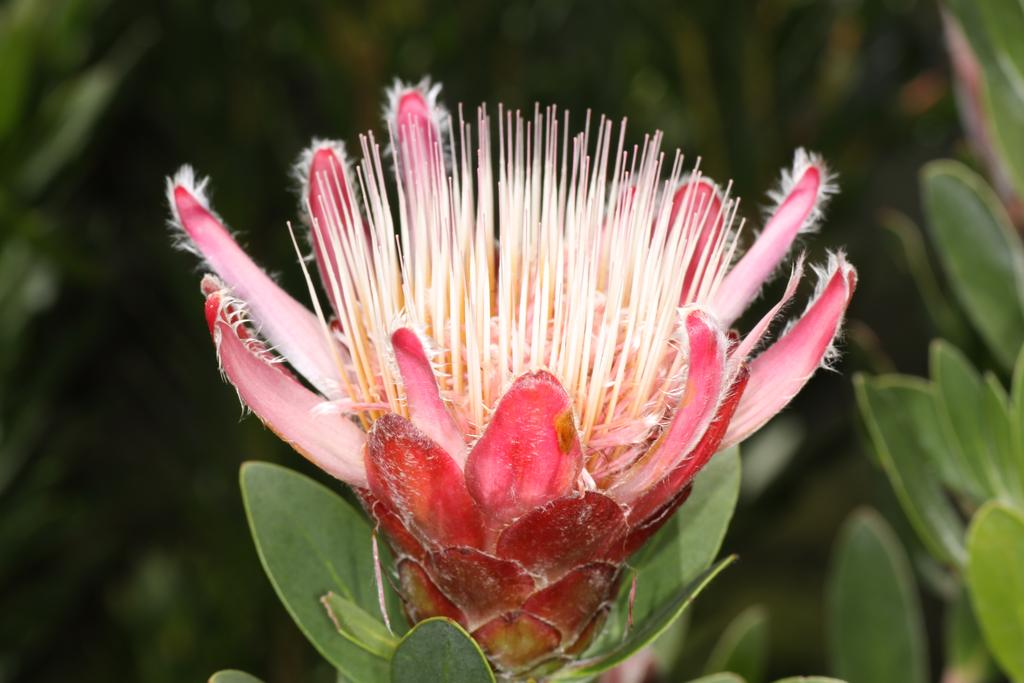

The shrub is large and has a diameter of 3 m (9.8 ft) and grows up to 70 cm (28 in) tall. It flowers mainly from January to February. The plant dies after a fire but the seeds survive. The seeds are stored in a shell and released after they are ripe and are dispersed by the wind. The plant is unisexual. Pollination takes place through the action of birds.

== Distribution and habitat ==
The plant occurs in the Swartberg and Kammanassie Mountains. It grows on rocky, southern slopes in cool areas at altitudes of 1700 - 2000m.

== Gallery ==
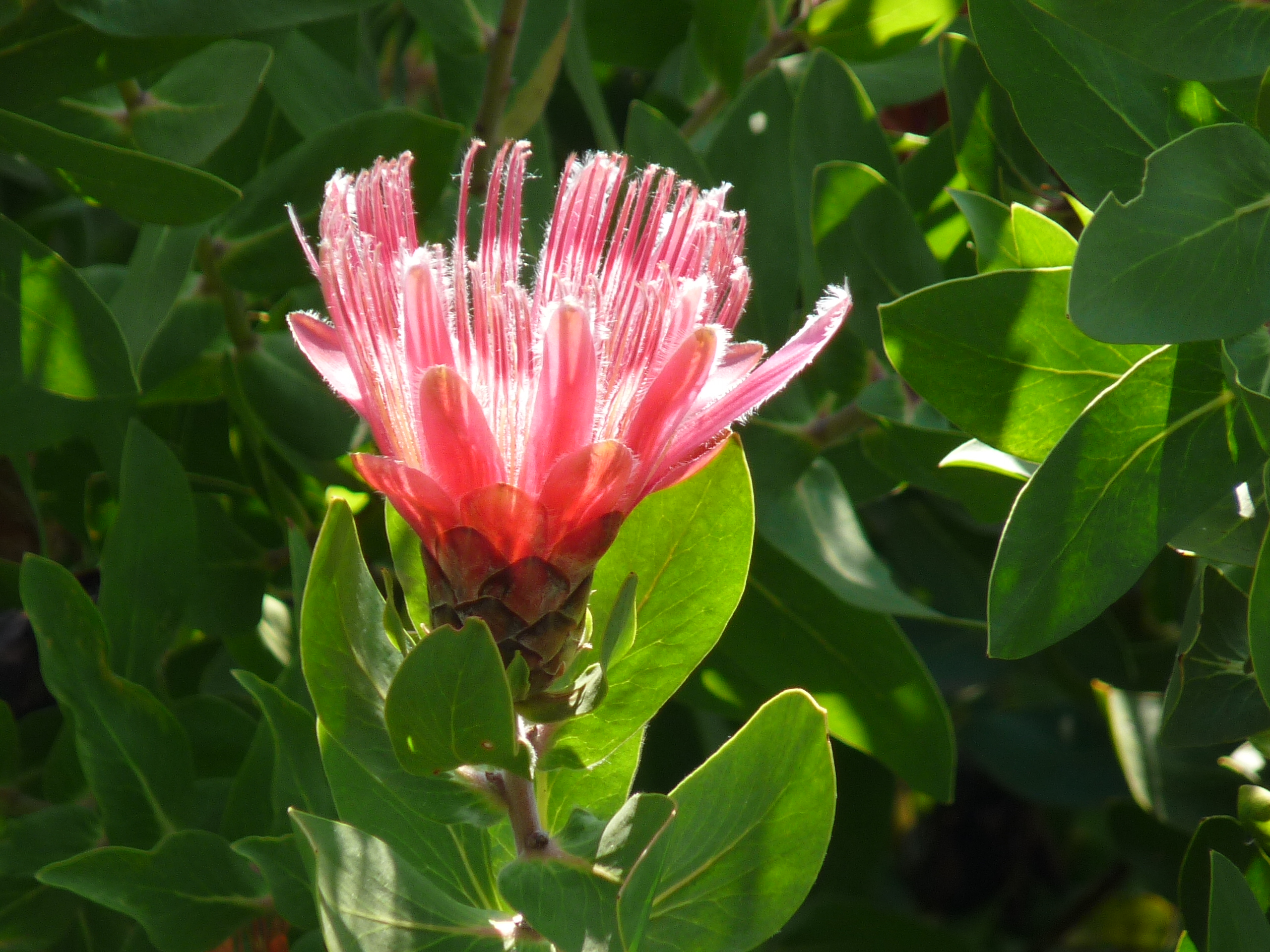

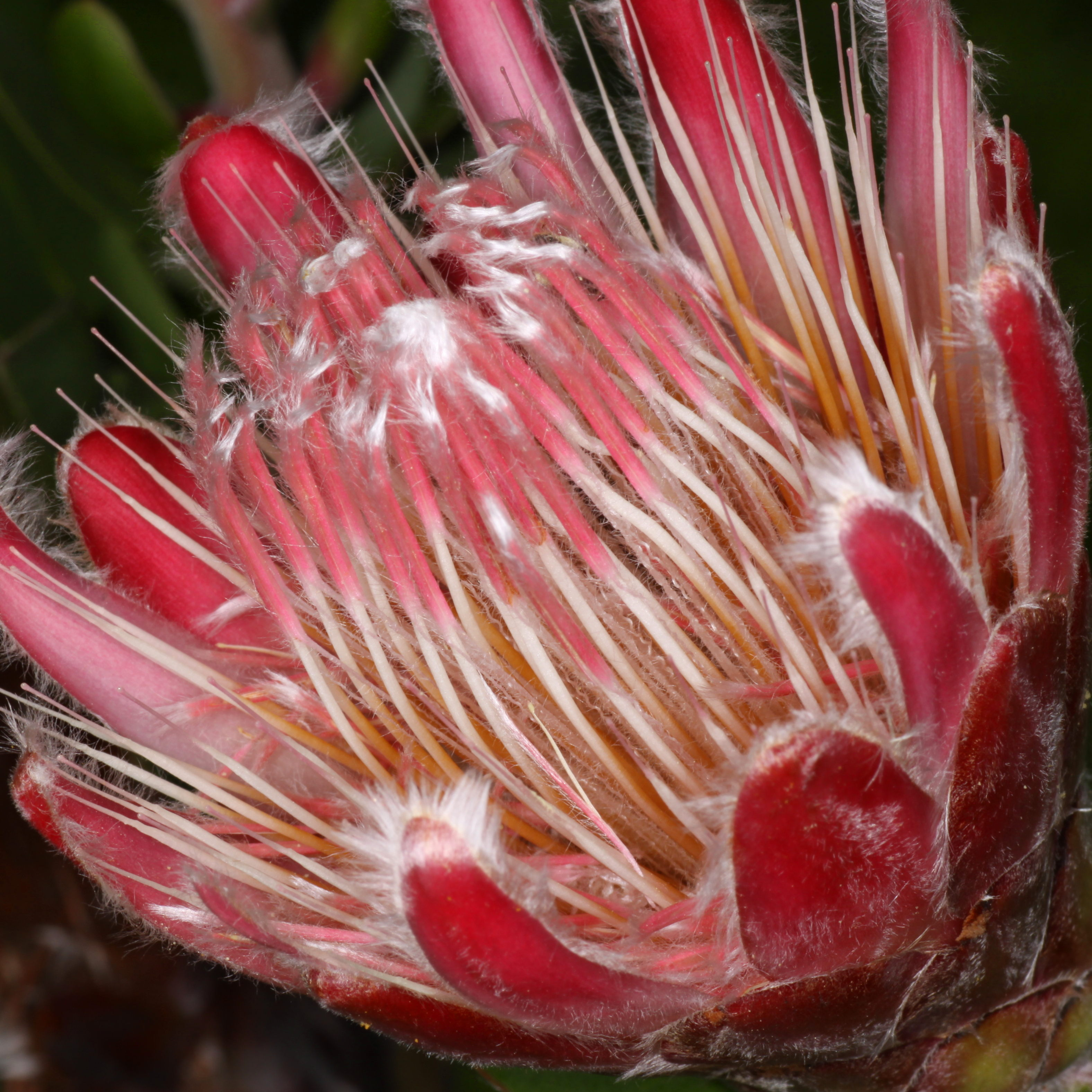

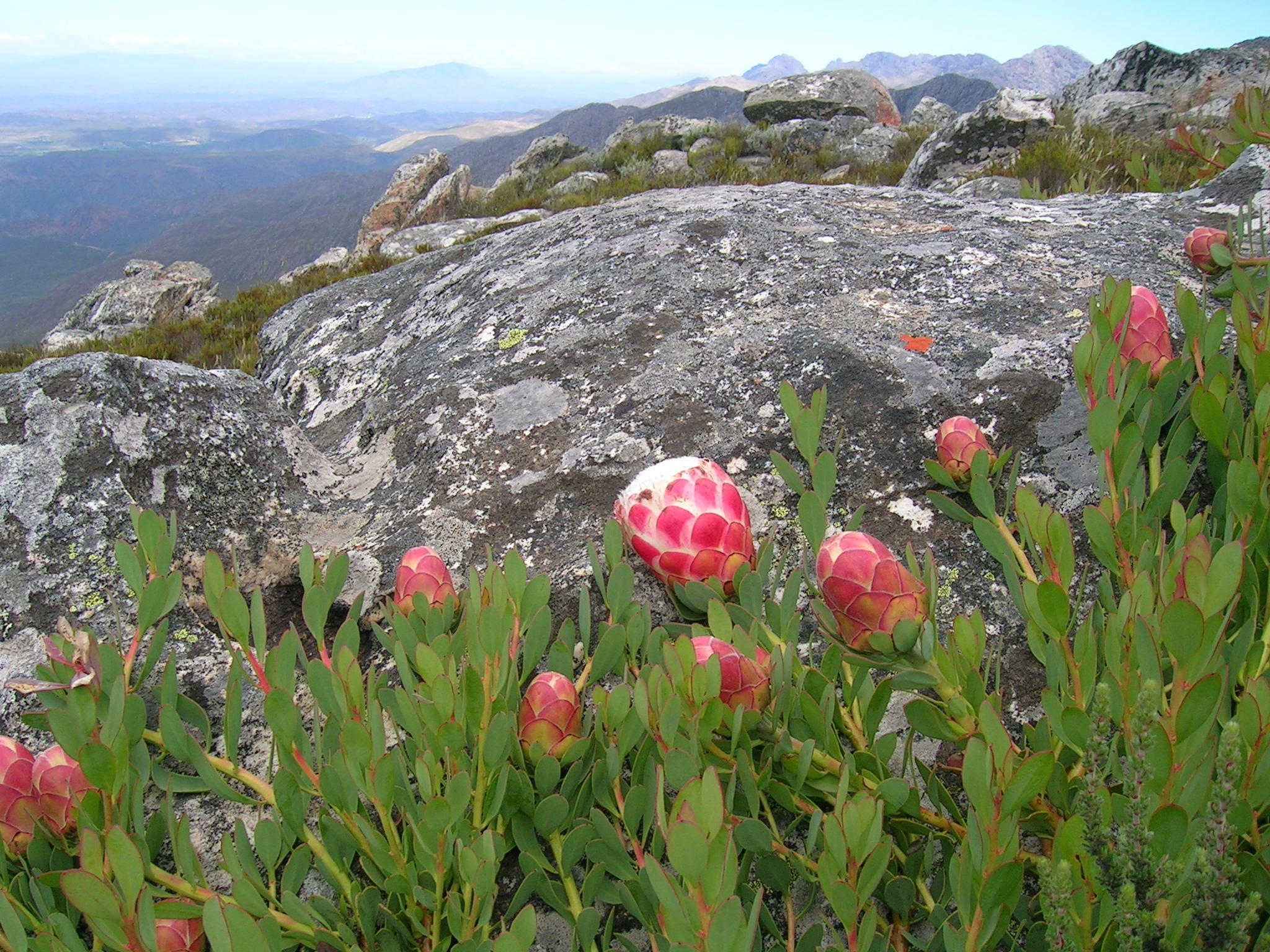

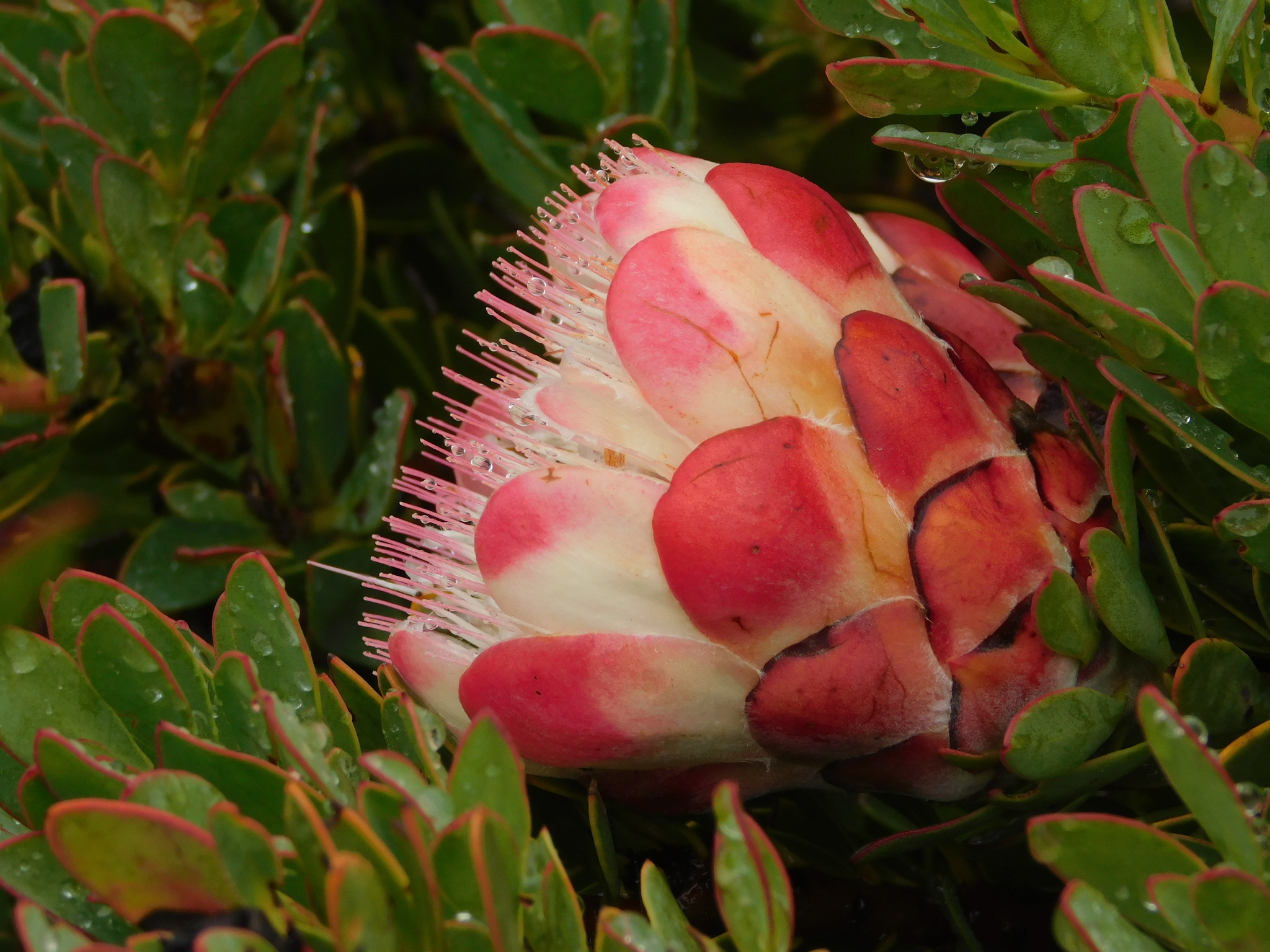

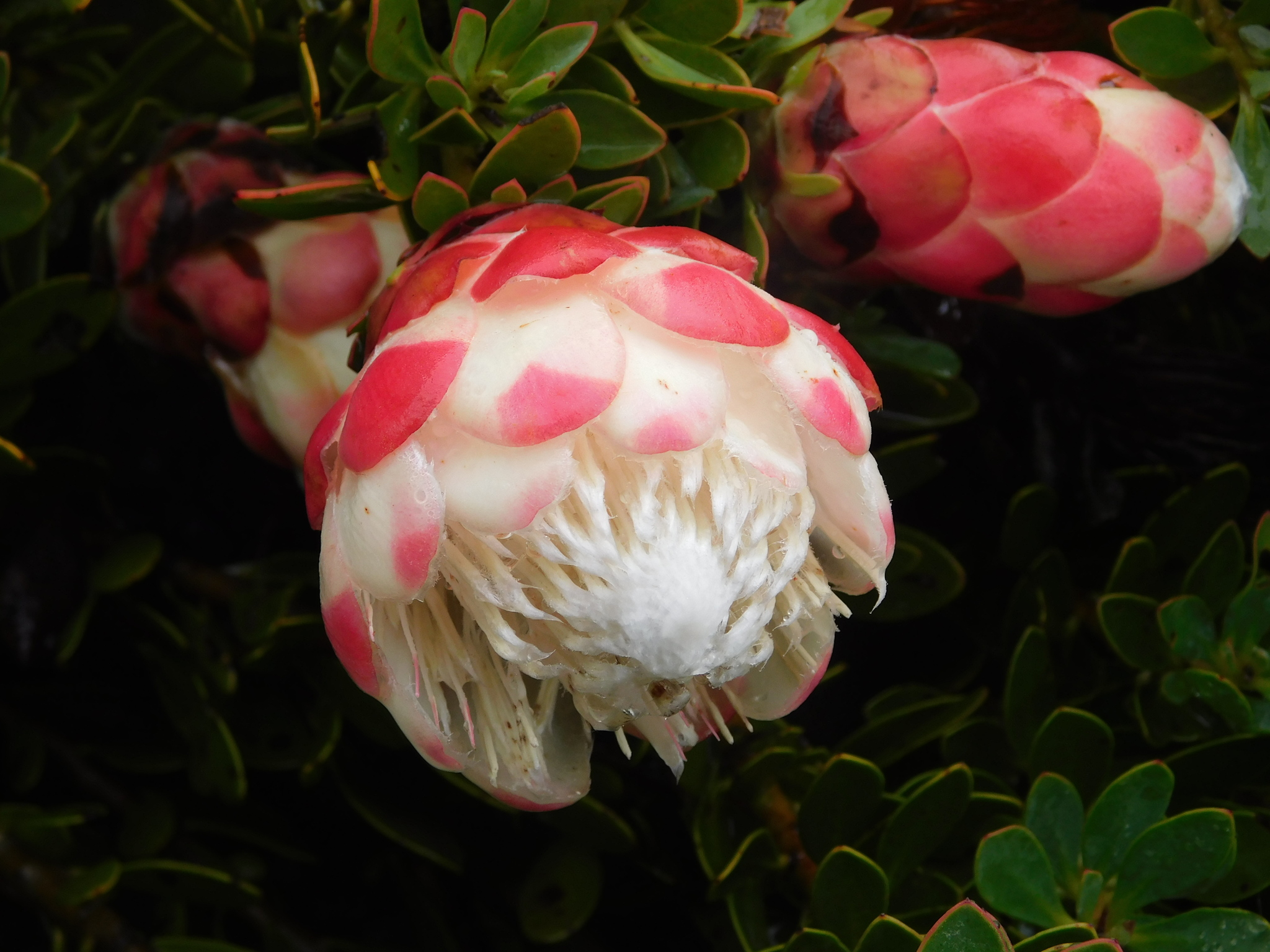

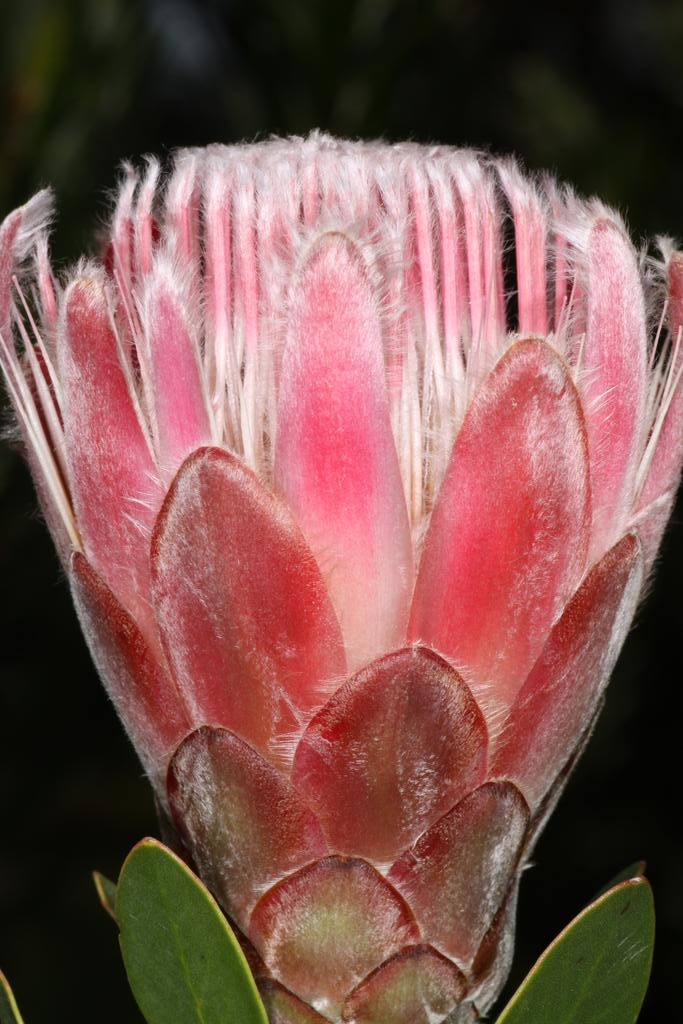

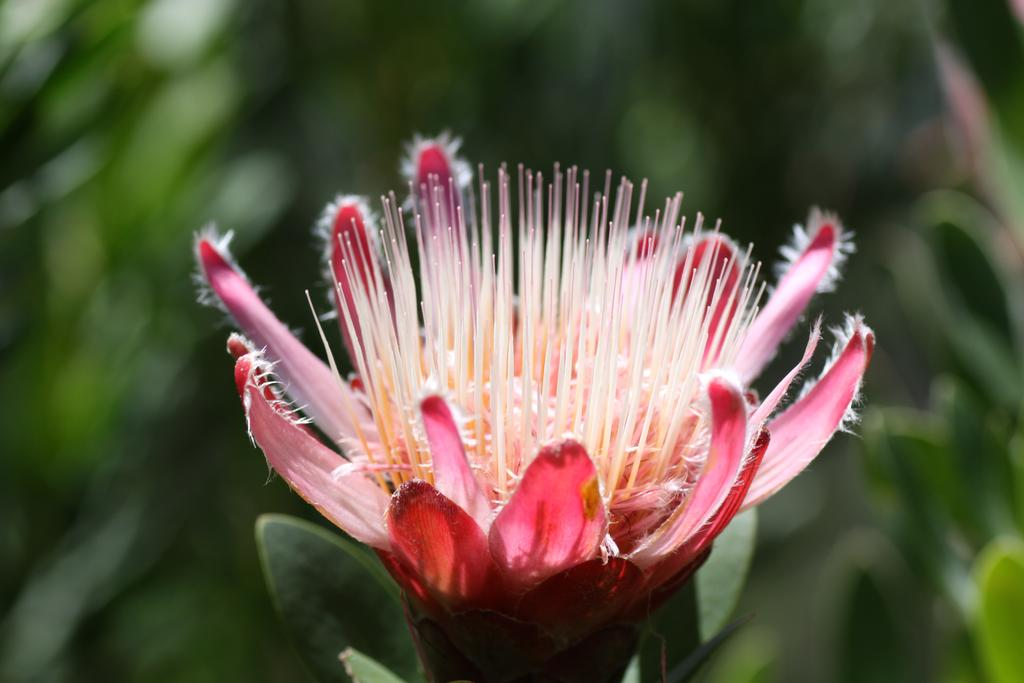

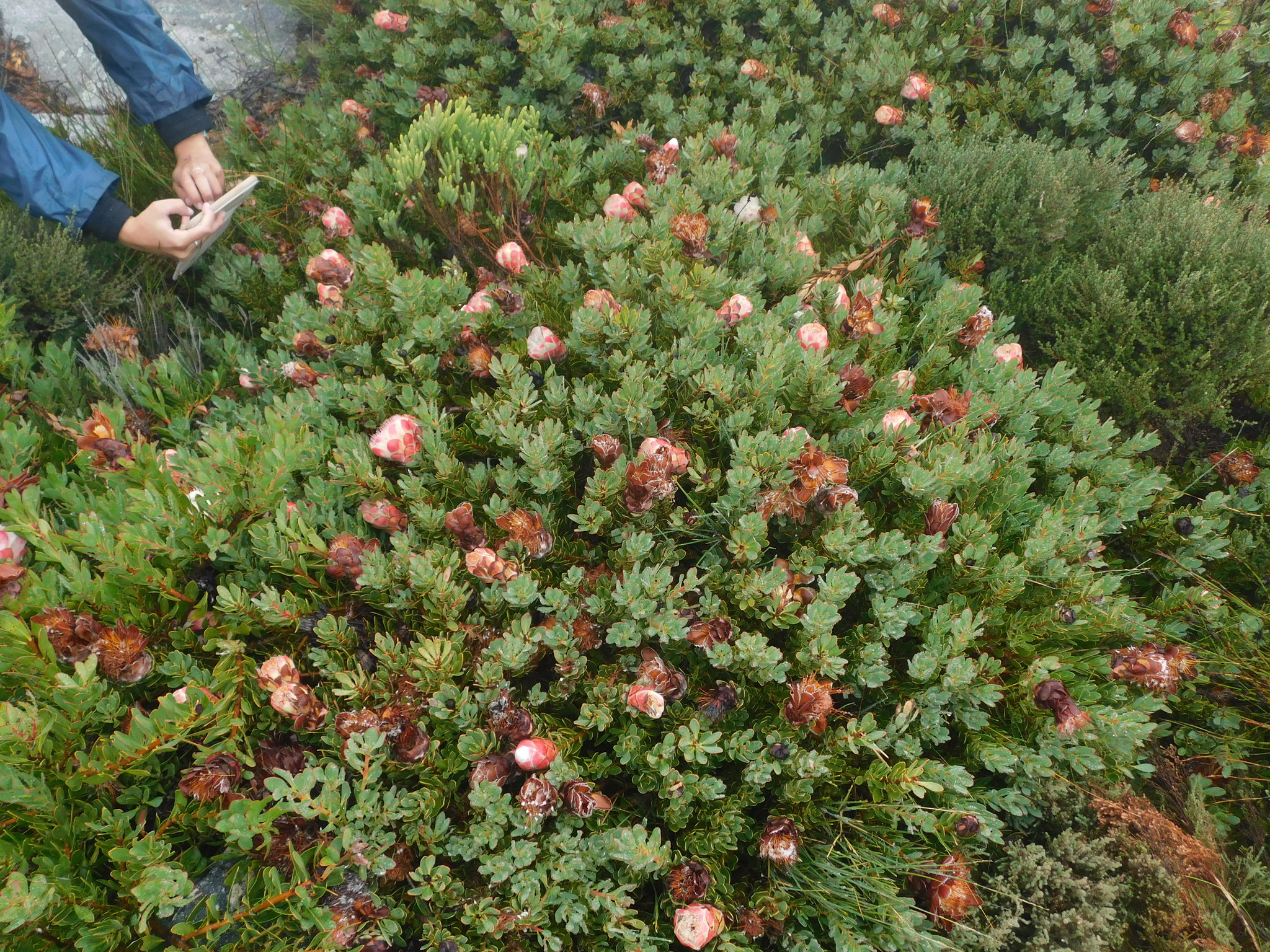

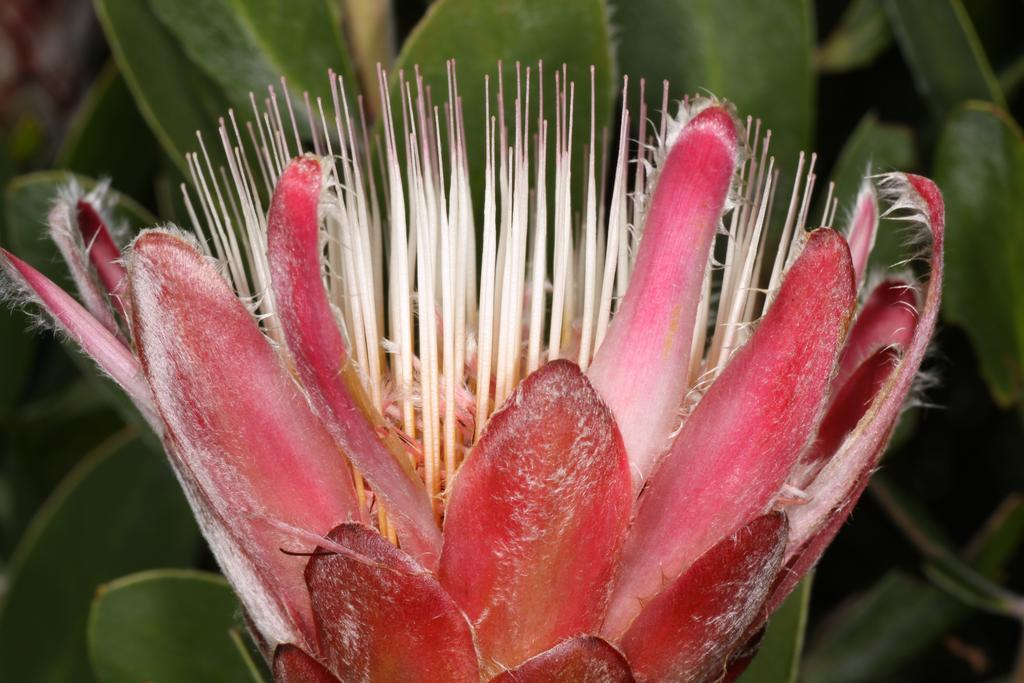

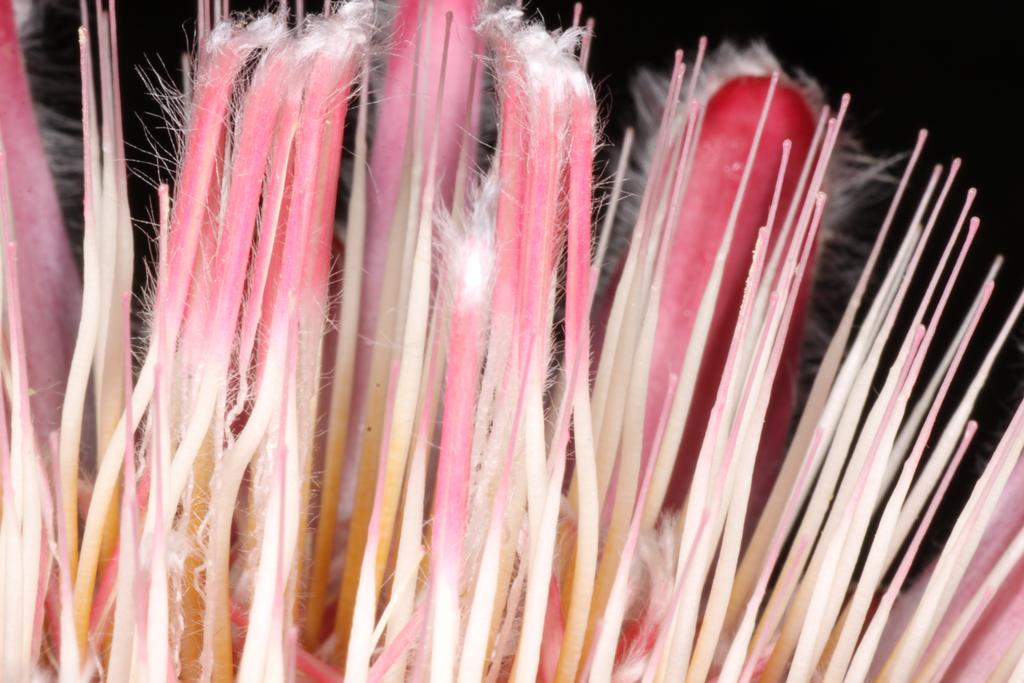

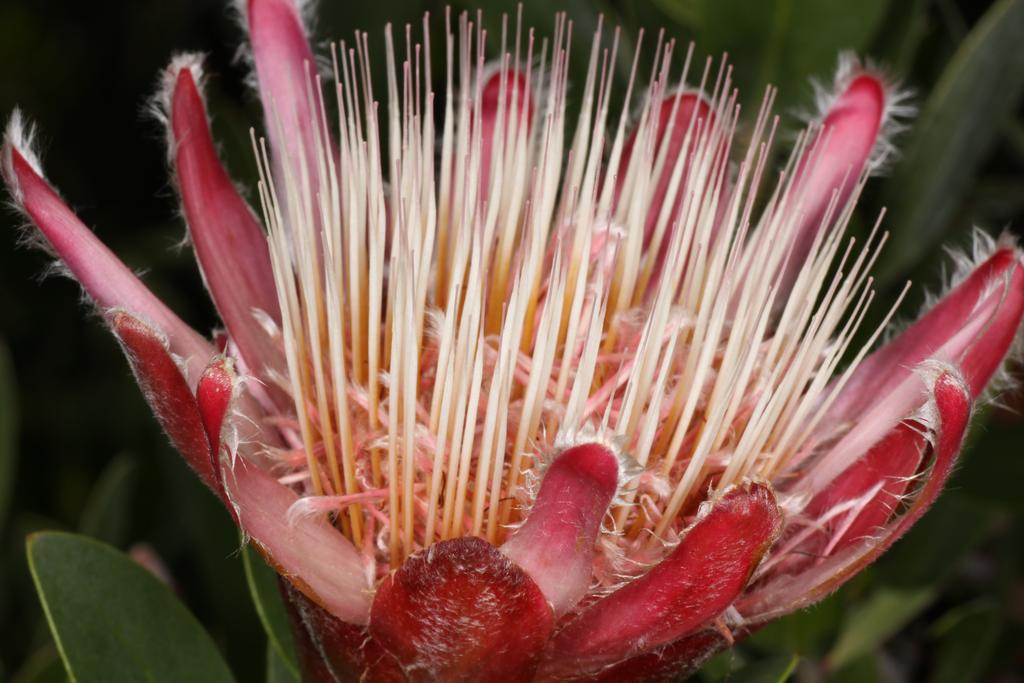
