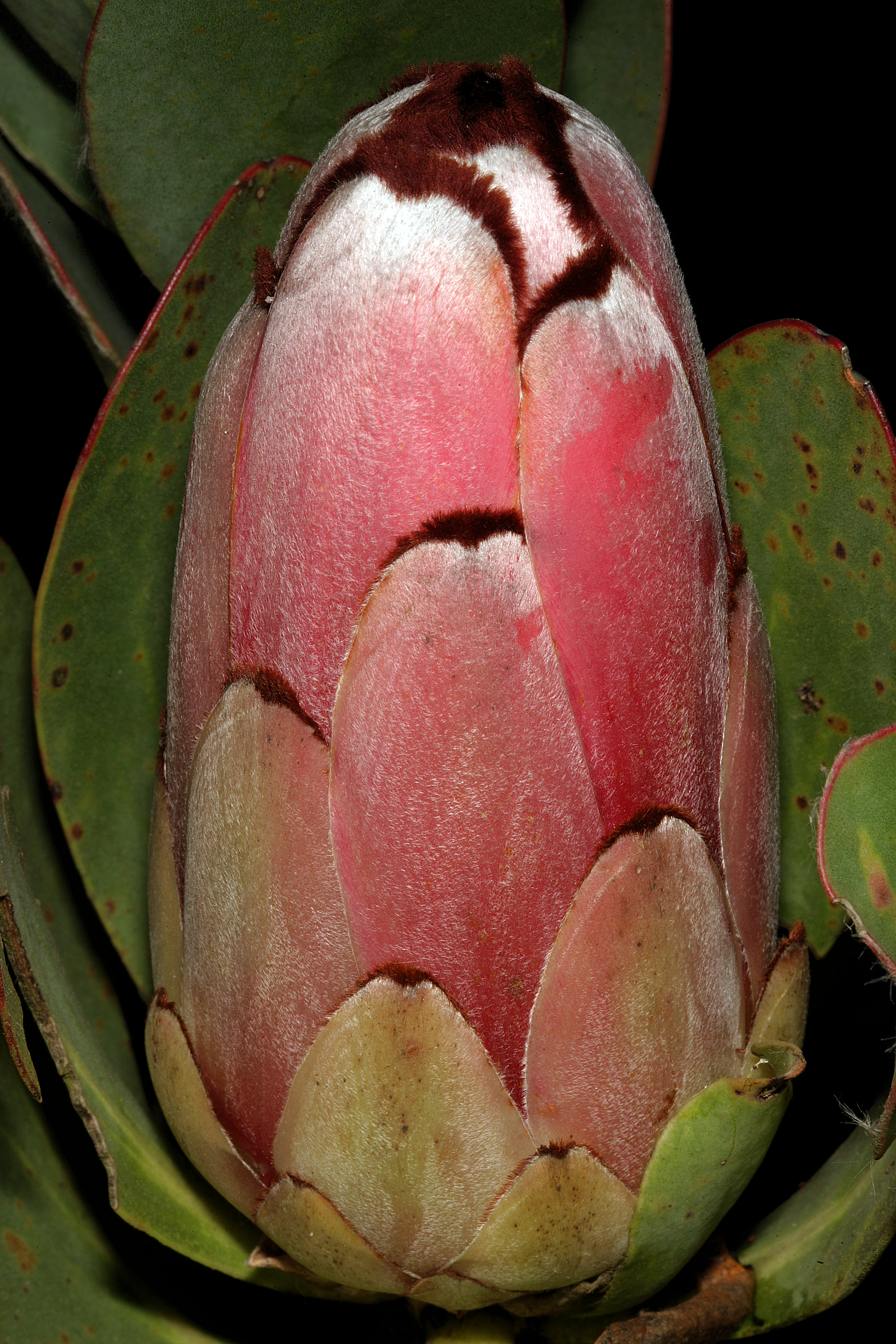

Conservation status
- Endangered (IUCN 3.1)

Scientific classification
- Kingdom: Plantae
- Clade: Tracheophytes
- Clade: Angiosperms
- Clade: Eudicots
- Order: Proteales
- Family: Proteaceae
- Genus: Protea
- Species: P. stokoei

Binomial name
- Protea stokoei E.Phillips

= Protea stokoei =

Species of flowering shrub

Protea stokoei is a flowering shrub which belongs to the genus Protea. The plant is endemic to South Africa. It is found in the Kogelberg and Greenland mountains around Elgin.

The shrub grows upright, grows up to 3.0 metres in height, and blooms from May to October. A fire destroys the plant but the seeds survive. The seed is stored in a cap and spread by the wind. The plant is unisexual. Pollination occurs through the action of birds. The plant grows in moist, peat-like soil at altitudes of 900–1200 m.

In English it is known as the pink sugarbush. The tree's national number is 97.5.
