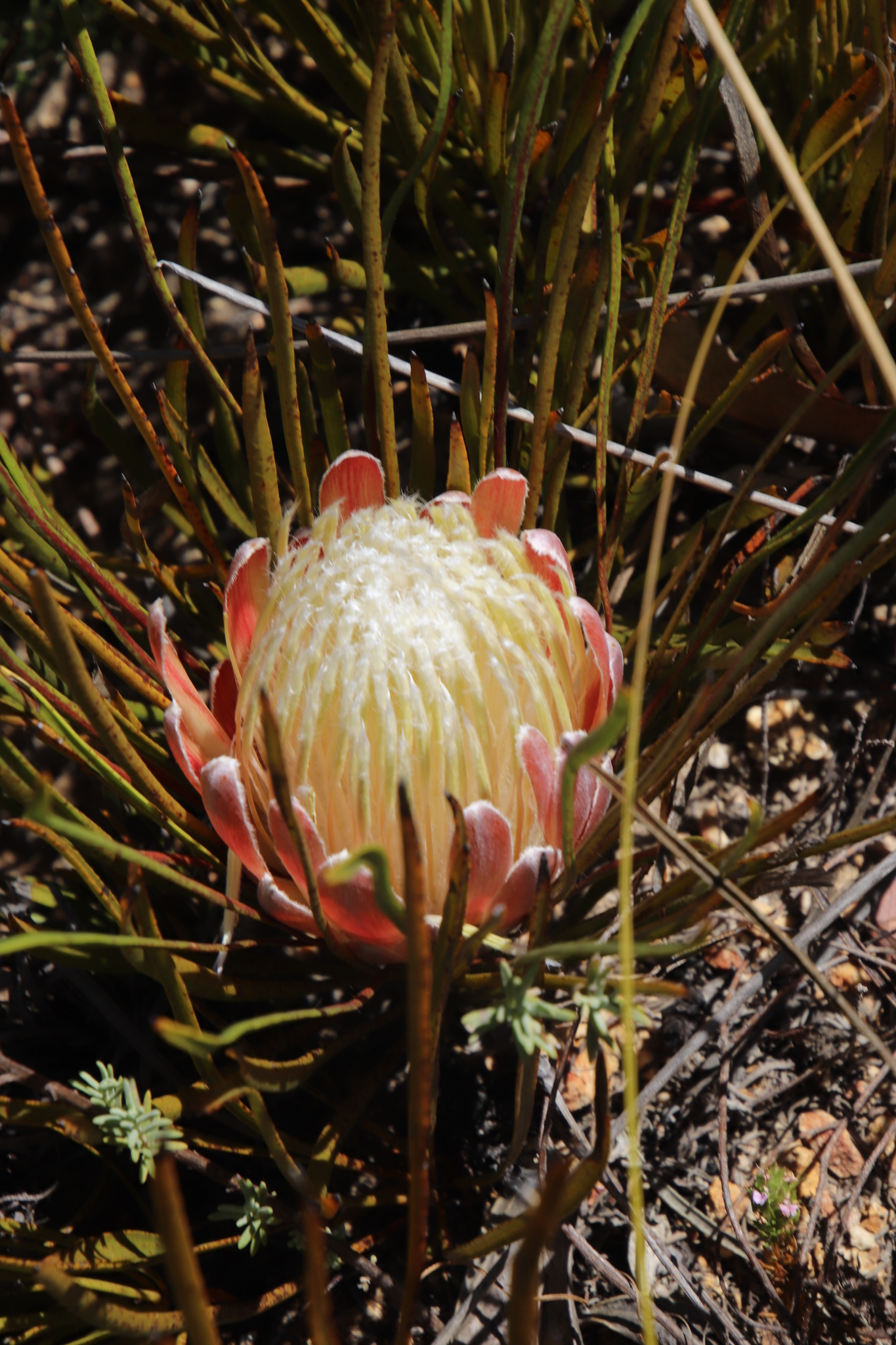

Conservation status
- Vulnerable (IUCN 3.1)

Scientific classification
- Kingdom: Plantae
- Clade: Embryophytes
- Clade: Tracheophytes
- Clade: Angiosperms
- Clade: Eudicots
- Order: Proteales
- Family: Proteaceae
- Genus: Protea
- Species: P. scorzonerifolia

Binomial name
- Protea scorzonerifolia (Salisb. ex Knight) Rycroft

= Protea scorzonerifolia =

Species of flowering plant

Protea scorzonerifolia, the channel-leaf sugarbush, is a flower-bearing shrub belonging to the genus Protea. The plant is endemic to South Africa and occurs in the Du Toit's Kloof, Franschhoek and Groot-Winterhoek mountains. The plant became extinct on the Cape Peninsula.

In Afrikaans it is known as the kanaalblaarsuikerbos.
