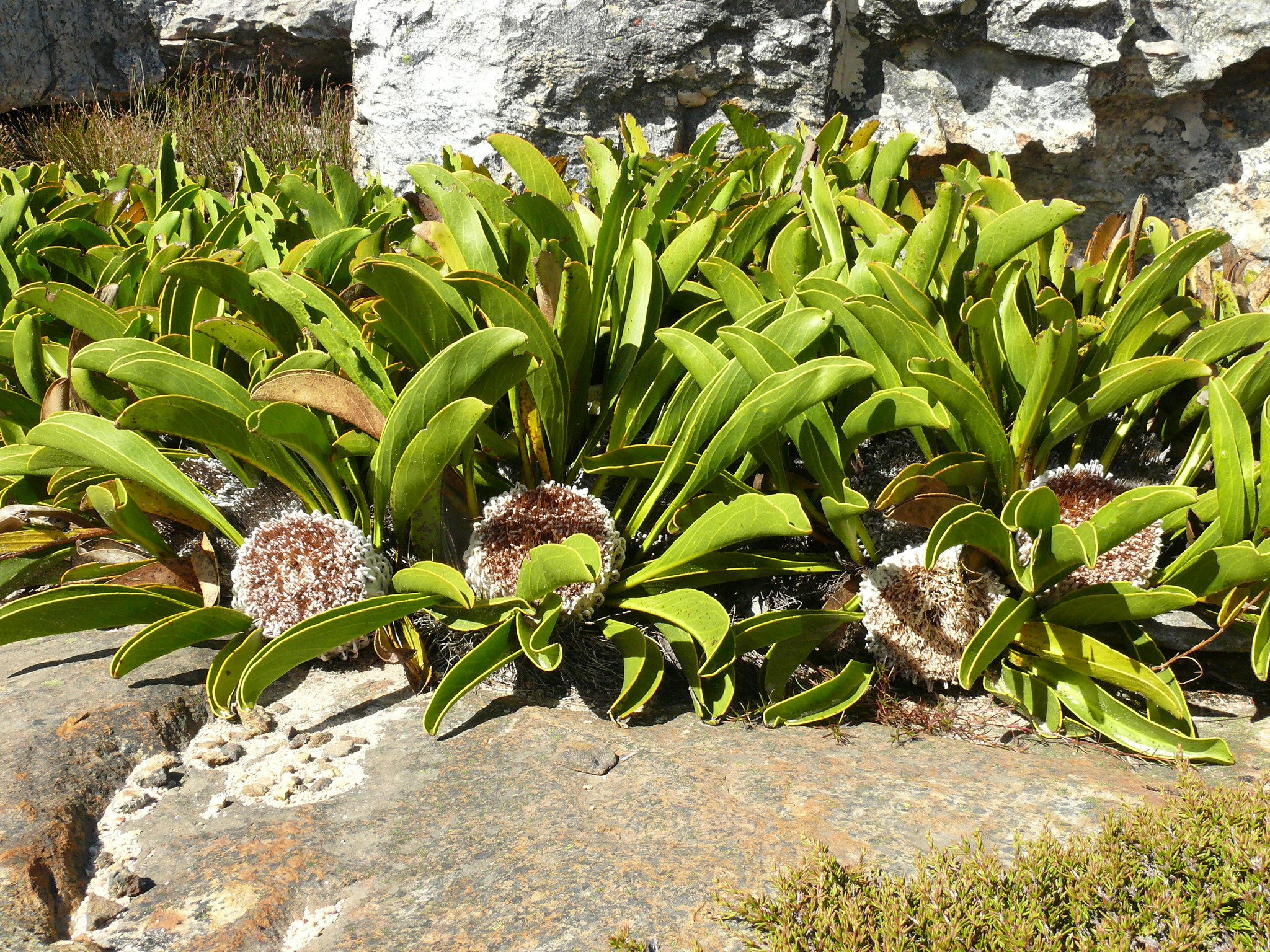

Conservation status
- Vulnerable (IUCN 3.1)

Scientific classification
- Kingdom: Plantae
- Clade: Embryophytes
- Clade: Tracheophytes
- Clade: Angiosperms
- Clade: Eudicots
- Order: Proteales
- Family: Proteaceae
- Genus: Protea
- Species: P. cryophila

Binomial name
- Protea cryophila Bolus

= Protea cryophila =

Species of flowering plant

Protea cryophila, the snowball sugarbush, snow protea, or snowball protea, is a flowering shrub of the genus Protea. The plant is endemic to the Cederberg.

The shrub is dense, wooded and grows 3 m (9.8 ft) in diameter and blooms from January to April. Fire destroys the plant but the seeds survive. The seed is stored in a cap, released after a long period and spread through the wind. The plant is unisexual. Pollination occurs through the action of rodents. The plant grows on sandstone soil on rock moldings at heights of 1,750–1,900 m (5,740–6,230 ft)
