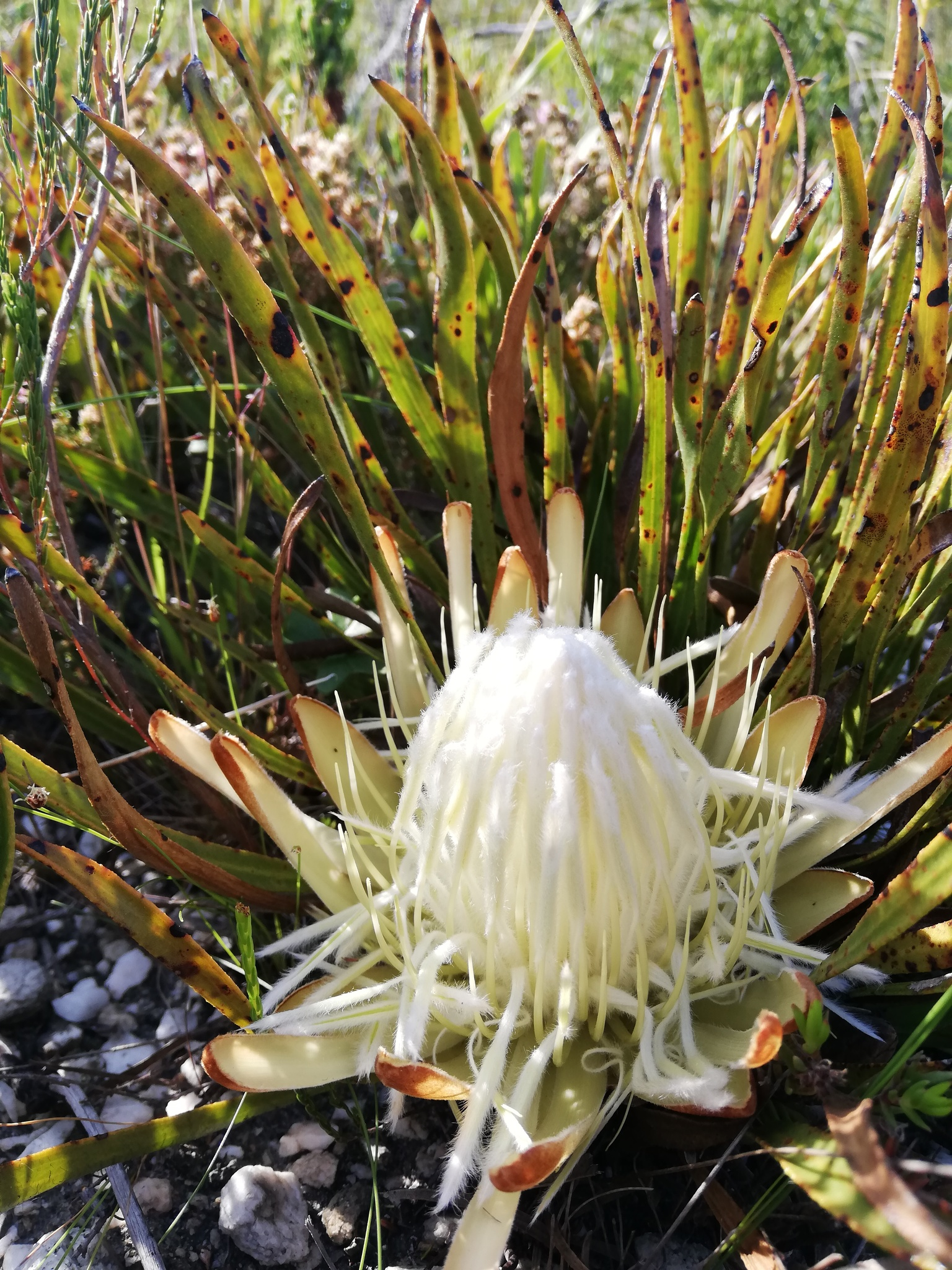

Conservation status
- Vulnerable (IUCN 3.1)

Scientific classification
- Kingdom: Plantae
- Clade: Embryophytes
- Clade: Tracheophytes
- Clade: Angiosperms
- Clade: Eudicots
- Order: Proteales
- Family: Proteaceae
- Genus: Protea
- Species: P. aspera

Binomial name
- Protea aspera E.Phillips

= Protea aspera =

Rough leaf sugar bush

Species of flowering plant

Protea aspera, commonly known as rough leaf sugar bush or aardroos suikerbos, is a flowering shrub that belongs to the well-known Protea genus. The plant is endemic to South Africa and is found in the Kleinrivierberge, Bredasdorpberge and Garcia's Pass.

The shrub is a dense, root-like plant that forms a mat and grows only 50 cm (20 in) high; it blooms from September to December, peaking in September and October. The plant sprouts again after burning. The seed is released one to two years after flowers are formed and spread through the wind. The plant is unisexual. Pollination may occur through the action of mammals. The plant grows in shale and sandy soil at altitudes of 0 to 200 m (0 to 656 ft).

The plant is a vulnerable species.
