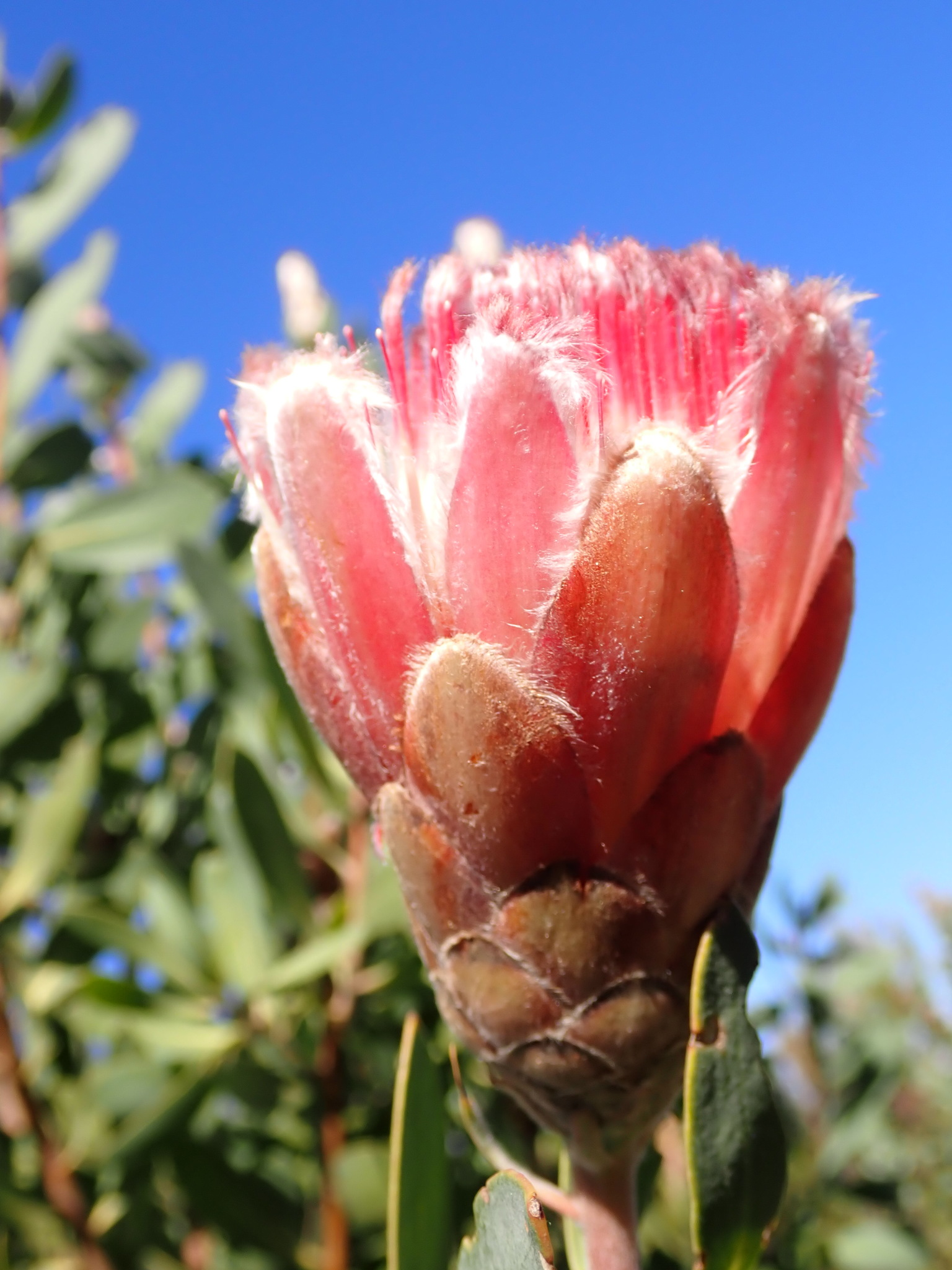

Conservation status
- Vulnerable (IUCN 3.1)

Scientific classification
- Kingdom: Plantae
- Clade: Tracheophytes
- Clade: Angiosperms
- Clade: Eudicots
- Order: Proteales
- Family: Proteaceae
- Genus: Protea
- Species: P. lacticolor

Binomial name
- Protea lacticolor Salisb.

= Protea lacticolor =

Species of flowering plant

Protea lacticolor or the Hottentot sugarbush, Hottentot white sugarbush or Hottentot's Holland sugarbush, is a flowering shrub of the Protea genus. It is also known as the Hottentotwitsukkerbos. The plant is endemic to South Africa and is found from the Slanghoek to the Hottentots Holland Mountains and also the Groenlandberg.

The shrub is large, erect and grows up to 6 m (20 ft) high and blooms mainly from March to April. The plant dies after a fire but the seeds survive. The seeds are stored in a cap and released after they are ripe and spread by the wind. The plant is unisexual. Pollination occurs through the action of birds. The plant grows on the banks of streams or wet Sederberg shale at altitudes of 600–1,500 m (2,000–4,900 ft). The plant's national tree number is 90.
