= Protea nubigena =

Cloud sugarbush

Conservation status
- Critically Endangered (IUCN 3.1)

Scientific classification
- Kingdom: Plantae
- Clade: Embryophytes
- Clade: Tracheophytes
- Clade: Angiosperms
- Clade: Eudicots
- Order: Proteales
- Family: Proteaceae
- Genus: Protea
- Species: P. nubigena

Binomial name
- Protea nubigena Rourke

Species of flowering plant

Protea nubigena, commonly known as cloud sugarbush, is a very rare species of a flowering shrub belonging to the Protea genus. It is endemic to KwaZulu-Natal, South Africa and is found in the uKhahlamba Basalt Grassland within the Royal Natal National Park, near Mont-Aux-Sources, at an altitude of about 2,250 metres (7,380 ft) in well-drained, humus-rich soil on shaded slopes.

== Description ==
The plant grows as an erect shrub which is up to 70 cm (28 in) high, and blooms from March to April. It is a long-lived species, and survives fires by resprouting from underground boles or rootstocks. The plant is monoecious with both sexes in each flower; the wind-dispersed seeds are not stored on the plant and are released immediately after ripening. It is pollinated by birds.

== Conservation ==
It is listed as 'critically endangered' on the SANBI red list, as the population of mature individual plants within the one known location are in decline, mostly due to poor fire management.

== Sources ==
- Pooley, Elsa (2003). Mountain flowers: a field guide to the flora of the Drakensberg and Lesotho. Durban South Africa: Flora Publications Trust, c/o Natal Herbarium. ISBN 978-0-620-30221-0. OCLC 53281866.
