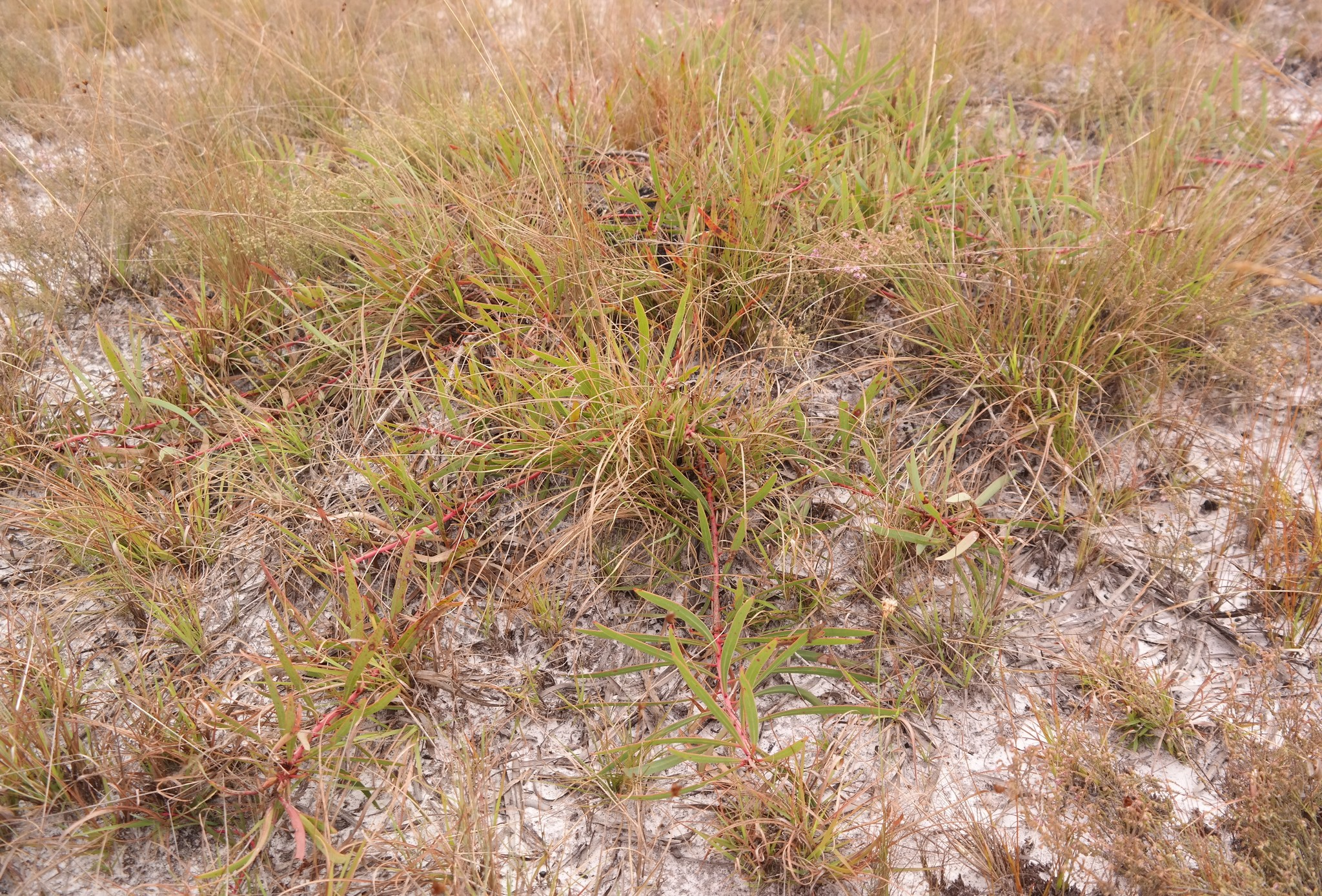

Conservation status
- Vulnerable (IUCN 3.1)

Scientific classification
- Kingdom: Plantae
- Clade: Tracheophytes
- Clade: Angiosperms
- Clade: Eudicots
- Order: Proteales
- Family: Proteaceae
- Genus: Protea
- Species: P. enervis

Binomial name
- Protea enervis Wild, 1956

= Protea enervis =

Species of shrub

Protea enervis, also known as the Chimanimani sugarbush, is a flowering shrub. It is native to the Chimanimani Mountains straddling Zimbabwe and Mozambique, and grows at altitudes of 1,680 to 2,000 metres.

The inflorescence is reddish-pink in colour.

== Horticulture ==
It offers a reddish-pink flower head. It requires full sun to partial shade, and prefers a dry mesic climate. It performs best in moderately (5.6-6.0) or slightly acidic (6.1-6.5) soil.
