= Protea rupestris =

Scientific classification
- Kingdom: Plantae
- Clade: Tracheophytes
- Clade: Angiosperms
- Clade: Eudicots
- Order: Proteales
- Family: Proteaceae
- Genus: Protea
- Species: P. rupestris

Binomial name
- Protea rupestris R.E.Fr. (1914)

Synonyms
- Protea bella Hauman (1944)

Species of flowering plant

Protea rupestris, also known as rocket sugarbush, is a flower-bearing tree of the genus Protea. The plant is found in Malawi, Mozambique, Angola, Tanzania, Democratic Republic of the Congo, and Zambia.

As a tree it has few branches and grows 10 metres (33 ft) in height. The plant is monoecious with both sexes in each flower.

It blooms from May to December. A wildfire will destroy the tree, but the seeds survive. The seed is released 9–12 months after flowering and dispersed by means of the wind. After being dispersed, the seeds simply lie on the ground until fires and rains create the best conditions for germination. Pollination occurs through the action of birds. The plant grows in open forests and mountainous grasslands at elevations of 1,200 to 1,950 metres (3,940 to 6,400 ft).

Although it occurs across a wide range, it relatively unknown and is believed to be uncommon.
