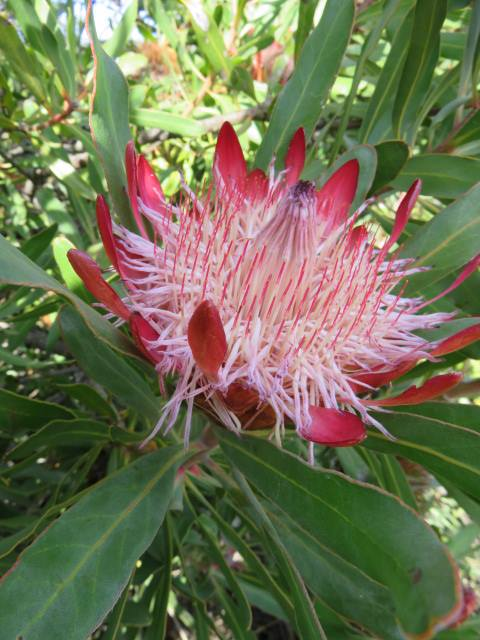
- Protea susannae cultivated at Rondevlei near Sedgefield, on the Garden Route, South Africa

Conservation status
- Near Threatened (IUCN 3.1)

Scientific classification
- Kingdom: Plantae
- Clade: Embryophytes
- Clade: Tracheophytes
- Clade: Angiosperms
- Clade: Eudicots
- Order: Proteales
- Family: Proteaceae
- Genus: Protea
- Species: P. susannae

Binomial name
- Protea susannae E.Phillips

= Protea susannae =

Species of flowering plant

Protea susannae, also known as stink-leaf sugarbush, is a flower-bearing shrub of the genus Protea. The plant is endemic to the southwestern Cape Region of South Africa.

Other vernacular names are stink-leaf protea. In the Afrikaans language it is known as stinkblaarsuikerbos.

The tree's national number is 98.1.

The species can grow up to 3 metres (9.8 ft) in height. The plant is monoecious, both sexes occur in each flower. It blooms from April to September.

Protea susannae is endemic to the Western Cape province of South Africa. It occurs from Stanford to Stilbaai.

== Ecology ==
During the periodic wildfires which pass through its habitat adult plants die, but the seeds can survive such an event. Pollination occurs through the action of birds. The seed is stored in the old, dry infructescence which remains persistently attached to the plant. The seed is eventually dispersed by means of the wind. The plant grows in calcareous and pH-neutral soil at altitudes from sea level to 200 metres (660 ft).
