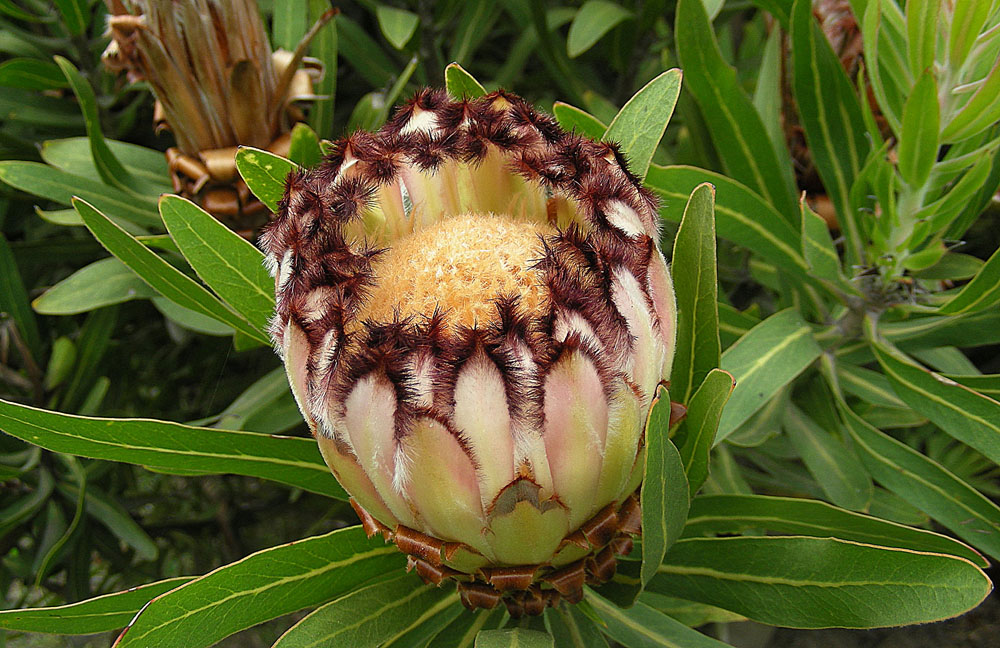

Conservation status
- Near Threatened (IUCN 3.1)

Scientific classification
- Kingdom: Plantae
- Clade: Embryophytes
- Clade: Tracheophytes
- Clade: Angiosperms
- Clade: Eudicots
- Order: Proteales
- Family: Proteaceae
- Genus: Protea
- Species: P. lepidocarpodendron

Binomial name
- Protea lepidocarpodendron L.

= Protea lepidocarpodendron =

Species of flowering plant

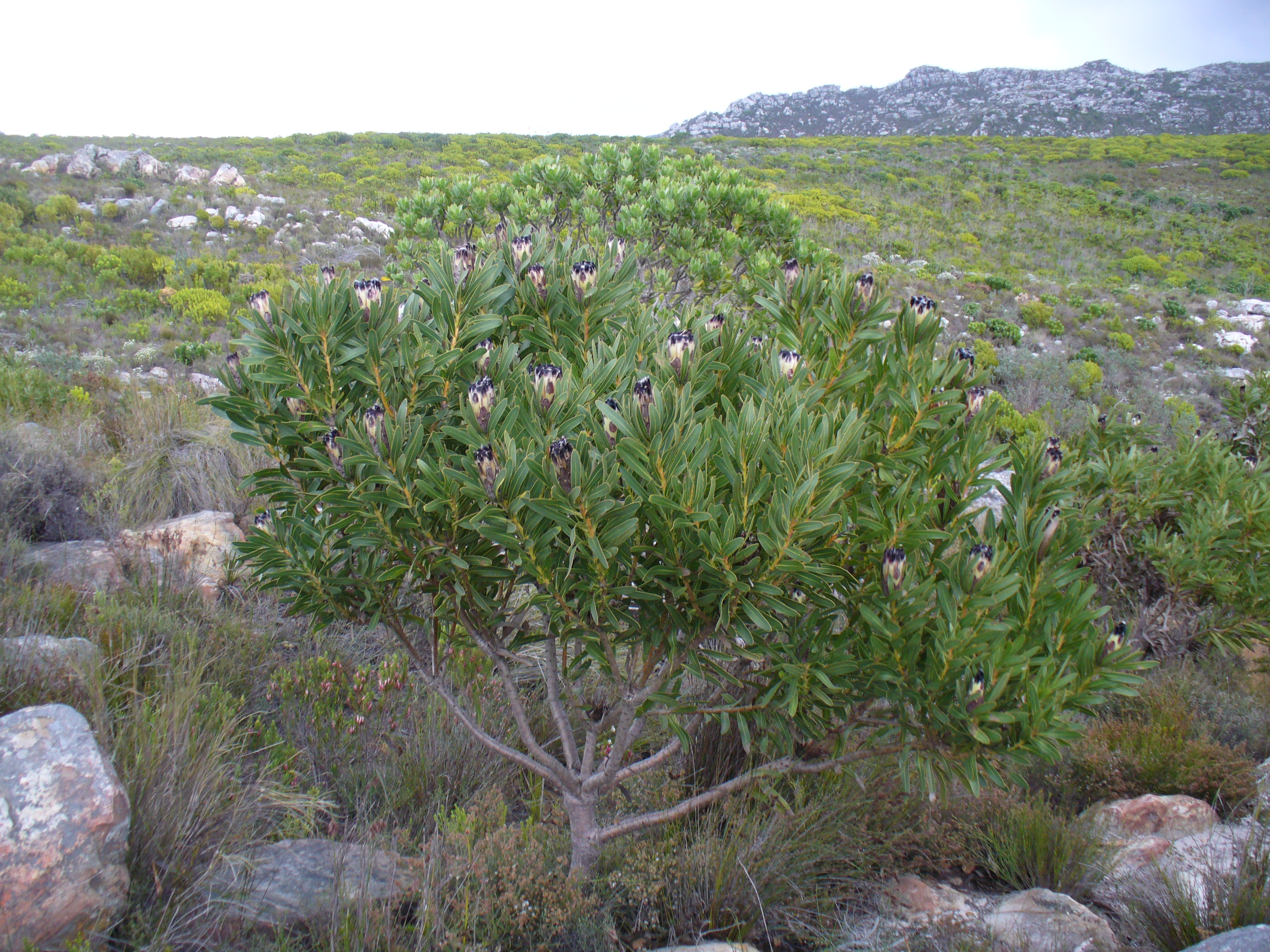

Protea lepidocarpodendron, the black bearded sugarbush, is a bearded Protea that is placed in the section Speciosae. It grows between 1 and 2 m (3 ft 3 in and 6 ft 7 in) tall, with narrowly oblong leaves. Flowerheads are oblong with a purple-black beard and black hairs below the beard. It typically grows in sandstone, fericrete and granite soils in the Western Cape from Cape Town to Kleinmond. It is near-threatened.
