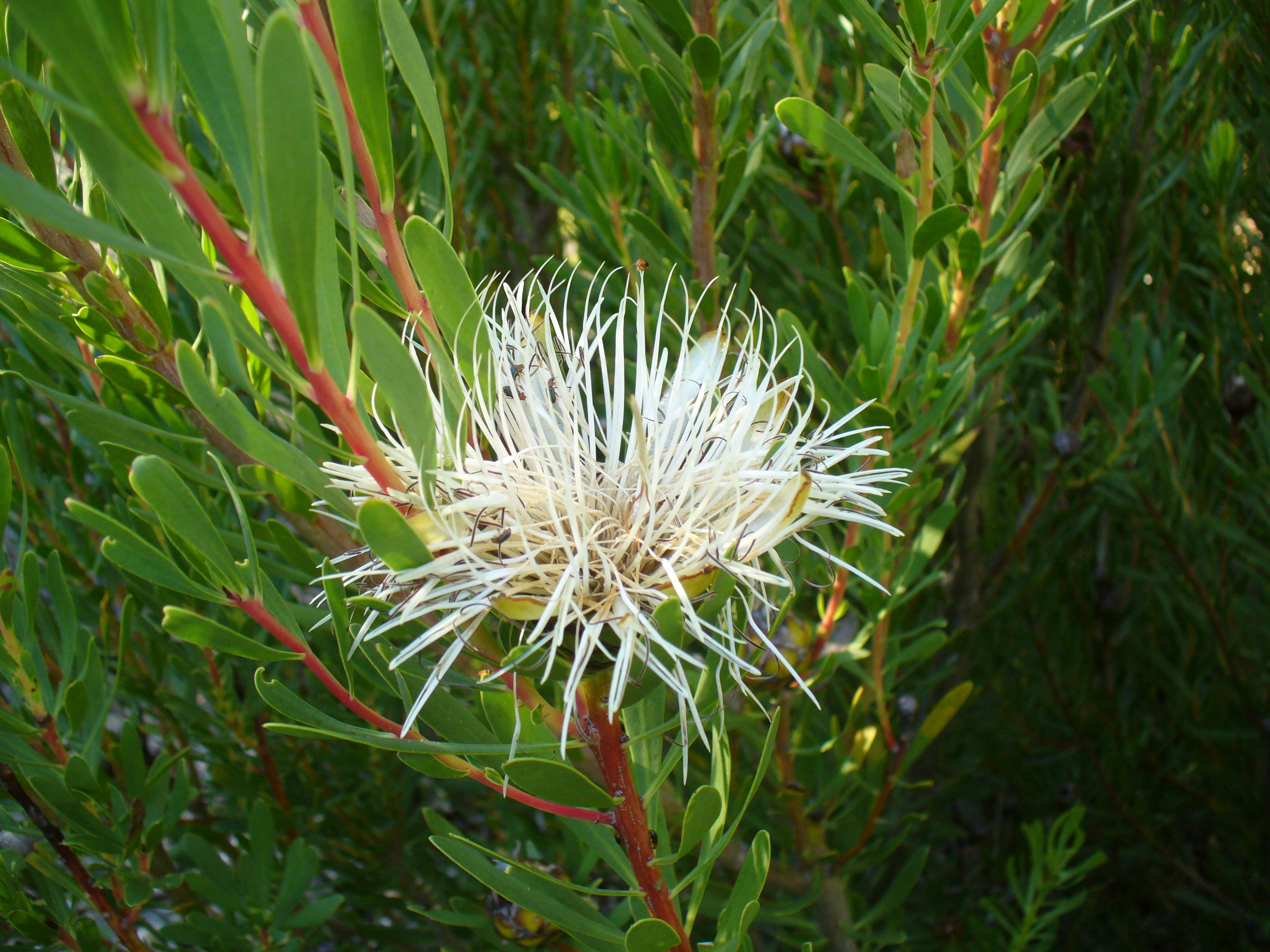

Conservation status
- Least Concern (IUCN 3.1)

Scientific classification
- Kingdom: Plantae
- Clade: Embryophytes
- Clade: Tracheophytes
- Clade: Angiosperms
- Clade: Eudicots
- Order: Proteales
- Family: Proteaceae
- Genus: Protea
- Species: P. lanceolata

Binomial name
- Protea lanceolata E.Mey. ex Meisn.

= Protea lanceolata =

Species of flowering plant

Protea lanceolata is a species of flowering plant in the family Proteaceae. It is endemic to the Cape Provinces of South Africa. It is threatened by habitat loss.
