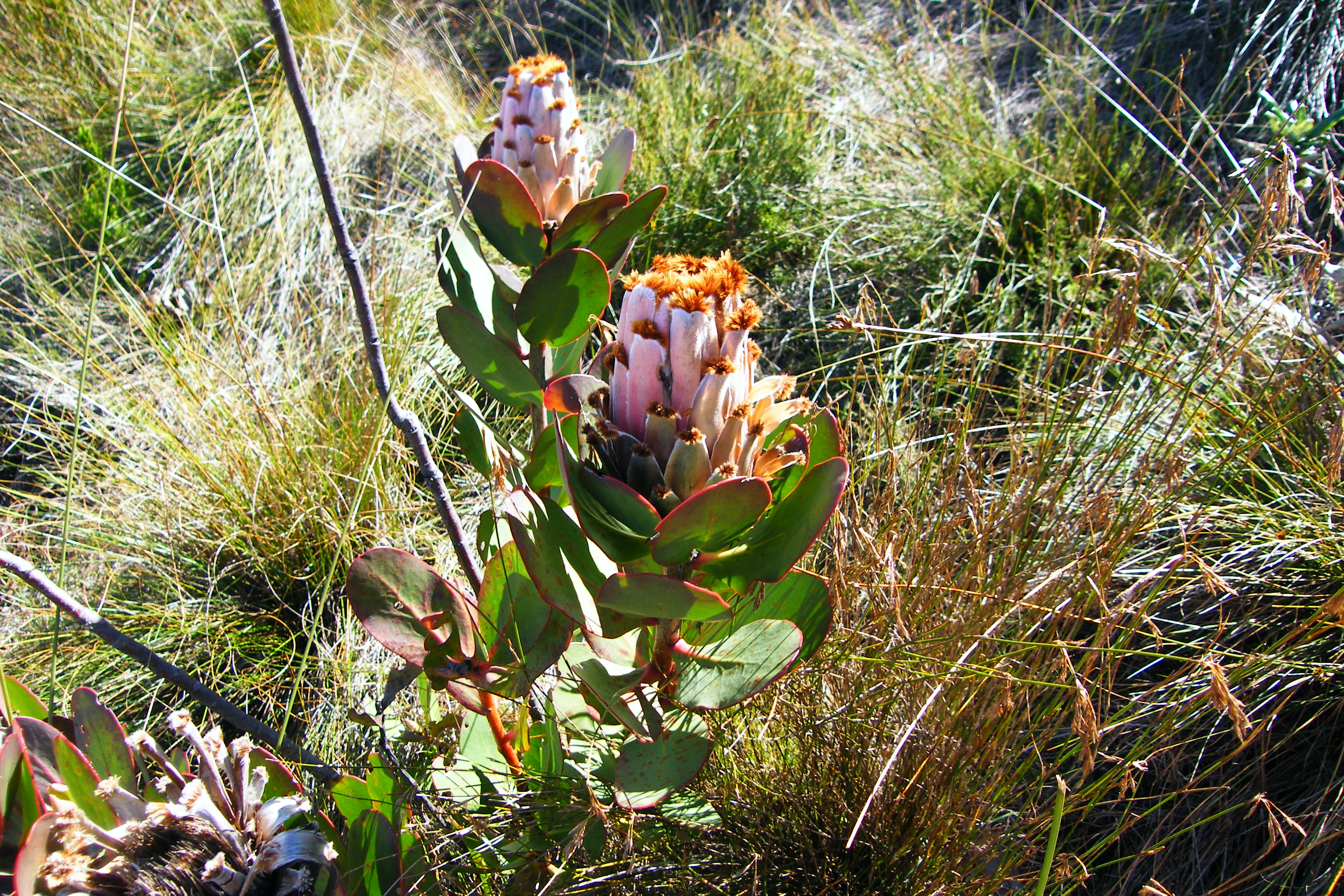

Conservation status
- Least Concern (IUCN 3.1)

Scientific classification
- Kingdom: Plantae
- Clade: Embryophytes
- Clade: Tracheophytes
- Clade: Angiosperms
- Clade: Eudicots
- Order: Proteales
- Family: Proteaceae
- Genus: Protea
- Species: P. speciosa

Binomial name
- Protea speciosa L.

= Protea speciosa =

Species of flowering plant

Protea speciosa, also known as the brown-beard sugarbush, is a flowering shrub which is classified as within the genus Protea.

== Taxonomy ==
The first specimen was to be found in the herbarium of Aylmer Bourke Lambert and was collected by William Roxburgh in during a stop at the Cape of Good Hope on the way to India.

== Description and ecology ==
The shrub grows upright, and grows up to a height of 1.2 metres (3 ft 11 in). It blooms from June to January, peaking in September to October. The plant is monoecious with both sexes in each flower. Pollination occurs through the action of birds rooting in the large flowerheads for nectar. The seeds are stored in woody capsules and are dispersed by means of the wind.

The plant grows in mountainous, cool, southern slopes at altitudes from sea level to 1,300 metres (4,300 ft). It can re-sprout again after being burnt off in periodic wildfires.

== Distribution ==
Protea speciosa is endemic to the Western Cape province of South Africa. It occurs from the Cape Peninsula to the Heuningberg mountain above the town of Bredasdorp.
