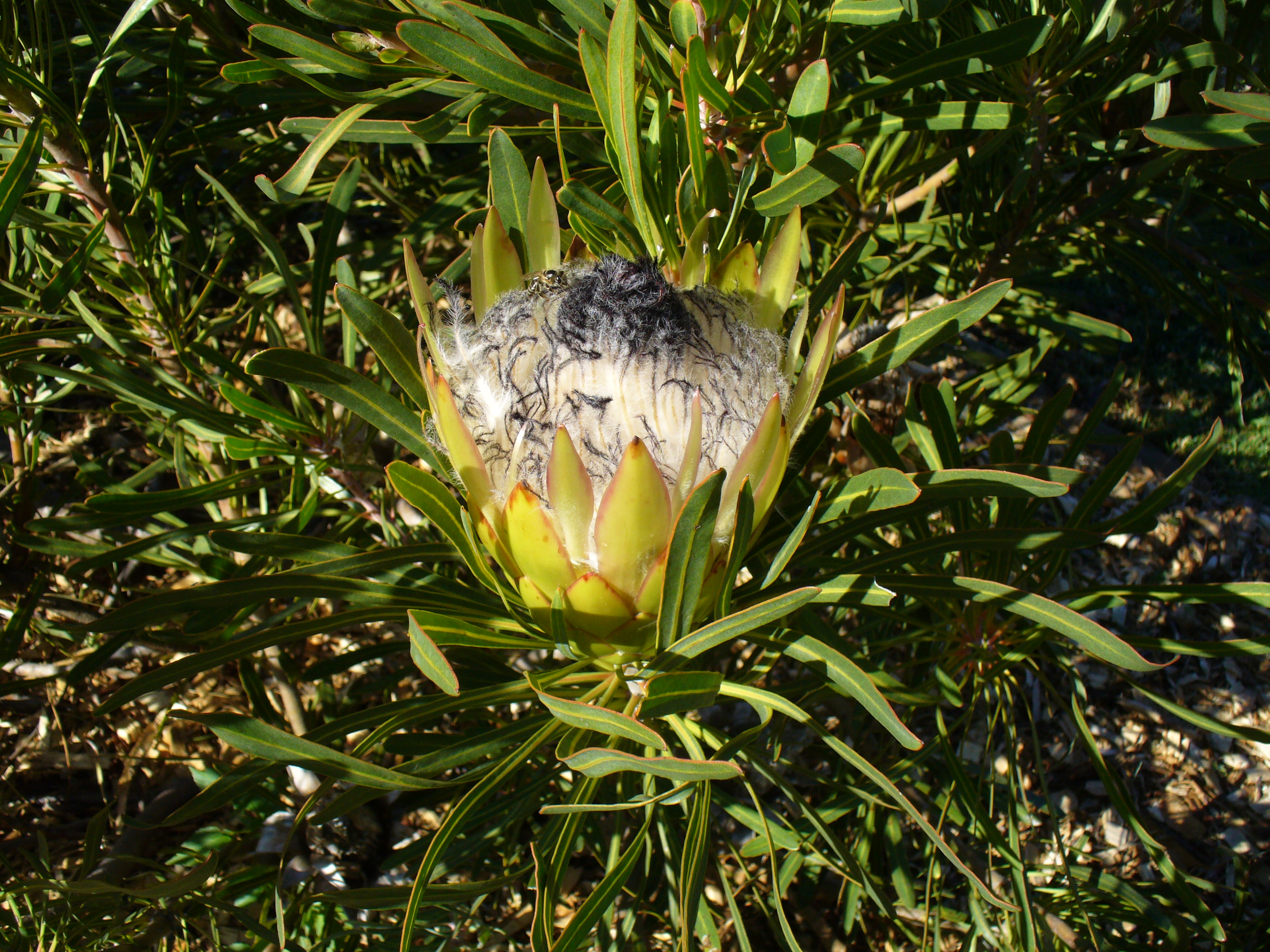

Conservation status
- Near Threatened (IUCN 3.1)

Scientific classification
- Kingdom: Plantae
- Clade: Embryophytes
- Clade: Tracheophytes
- Clade: Angiosperms
- Clade: Eudicots
- Order: Proteales
- Family: Proteaceae
- Genus: Protea
- Species: P. longifolia

Binomial name
- Protea longifolia Andrews

Synonyms
- Protea ignota Phillips; Protea ligulaefolia Sweet; Protea minor Compton; Protea umbonalis Sweet

= Protea longifolia =

Species of flowering plant

Protea longifolia, commonly known as the long-leaf sugarbush, is a shrub of the family Proteaceae that is native to the southwestern Cape Provinces of South Africa.
