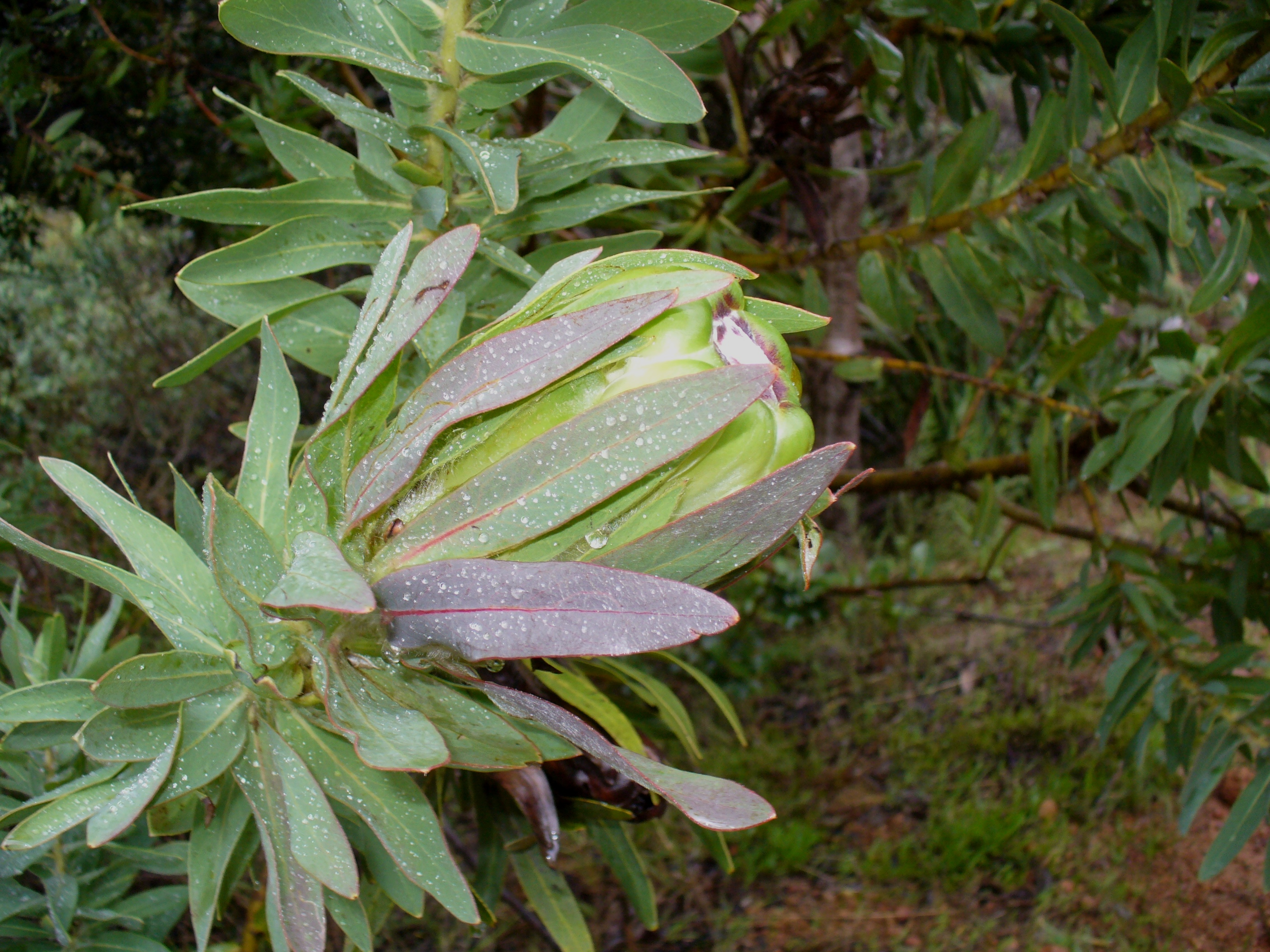

Conservation status
- Least Concern (IUCN 3.1)

Scientific classification
- Kingdom: Plantae
- Clade: Tracheophytes
- Clade: Angiosperms
- Clade: Eudicots
- Order: Proteales
- Family: Proteaceae
- Genus: Protea
- Species: P. coronata

Binomial name
- Protea coronata Lam.

= Protea coronata =

Species of shrub

Protea coronata is an erect shrub usually growing 2–3 m (6 ft 7 in – 9 ft 10 in) tall, but known to reach 5 m (16 ft). It produces an apple-green flower head and lanceolate leaves, turning purple-green around the flowerhead. Its stems are hairy. It flowers between April and September. The plant grows in dense stands on heavy clay soils in the Western Cape, South Africa, as well as the van Stadens region of the Eastern Cape.
