= List of Protea species =

The following is a list of Protea species.

== Table of Protea species ==
Section	Common name of section	Species name	Common name	Image	Distribution
Craterifolia	penduline protea	Protea effusa	Scarlet sugarbush		South Africa (Western Cape province)
Craterifolia	penduline protea	Protea namaquana	Kamiesberg sugarbush		South Africa (Kamiesberg mountains of Namaqualand in the Northern Cape province)
Craterifolia	penduline protea	Protea pendula	Nodding sugarbush		South Africa (Western Cape province)
Craterifolia	penduline protea	Protea recondita	Hidden sugarbush		South Africa (Western Cape province)
Craterifolia	penduline protea	Protea sulphurea	Sulphur sugarbush		South Africa (Western Cape province)
Crinitae	eastern ground protea	Protea foliosa	Leafy sugarbush		South Africa (Eastern Cape province)
Crinitae	eastern ground protea	Protea intonsa	Tufted sugarbush		South Africa (Swartberg and Kammanassie Mountains to the Baviaanskloof Mountains.)
Crinitae	eastern ground protea	Protea montana	Swartberg sugarbush		South Africa (Swartberg and Kammanassie Mountains.)
Crinitae	eastern ground protea	Protea tenax	Tenacious sugarbush		South Africa (Outeniqua, Tsitsikamma, Kouga and Winterhoek Mountains)
Crinitae	eastern ground protea	Protea vogtsiae	Kouga sugarbush		South Africa (Western and Eastern Cape)
Cristatae	Moorland protea	Protea asymmetrica	Inyanga sugarbush		Zimbabwe
Cristatae	Moorland protea	Protea wentzeliana	Wentzel's sugarbush		Zimbabwe, Mozambique, Malawi, southern Tanzania and central Angola.
Exsertae	White protea	Protea aurea aurea	Common shuttlecock protea		South Africa (Western Cape province)
Exsertae	White protea	Protea aurea potbergensis	Potberg sugarbush		South Africa (Potberg near Cape Infanta.)
Exsertae	White protea	Protea lacticolor	Hottentot sugarbush		South Africa (the Slanghoek to the Hottentots Holland Mountains and also the Groenlandberg.)
Exsertae	White protea	Protea mundii	Forest sugarbush		South Africa (Western Cape province)
Exsertae	White protea	Protea punctata	Water sugarbush		South Africa (Eastern and Western Cape province)
Exsertae	White protea	Protea subvestita	Waterlily sugarbush		South Africa (Eastern Cape province)
Exsertae	White protea	Protea venusta	Cascade sugarbush		South Africa (Clanwilliam to Grahamstown)
Hypocephalae	Rodent protea	Protea amplexicaulis	Claspingleaf sugarbush		South Africa (Western Cape province)
Hypocephalae	Rodent protea	Protea cordata	Heartleaf sugarbush		South Africa (Western Cape province)
Hypocephalae	Rodent protea	Protea decurrens	Linearleaf sugarbush		South Africa (Western Cape province)
Hypocephalae	Rodent protea	Protea humiflora	Patentleaf sugarbush		South Africa (Western Cape province)
Hypocephalae	Rodent protea	Protea subulifolia	Awl-leaf sugarbush		South Africa (Western Cape province)
Lasiocephalae	savanna protea	Protea gaguedi	African sugarbush		Sudan (including South Sudan), Eritrea, Ethiopia, Burundi, Rwanda, Uganda, Kenya, Tanzania, the Democratic Republic of Congo, Zambia, Angola, Botswana, Zimbabwe, Malawi, Mozambique, Namibia, Eswatini and South Africa.
Lasiocephalae	savanna protea	Protea welwitschii	Dwarf savanna sugarbush		Rwanda, Burundi, Uganda, Tanzania, the Democratic Republic of Congo, Zambia, Angola, Zimbabwe, Malawi, Mozambique, Lesotho, and South Africa.
Leiocephalea	grassveld protea	Protea afra subsp. afra	Highveld sugerbush		South Africa (Gauteng, Kwazulu-Natal, Northern Province, Mpumalanga, the Eastern Cape as far south as the Katberg mountains) and Lesotho
Leiocephalea	grassveld protea	Protea afra subsp. gazensis	Manica sugarbush		Mozambique and Zimbabwe, including the Nyanga Mountains and Chimanimani Mountains, and on Mount Gorongosa in Mozambique.
Leiocephalea	grassveld protea	Protea afra subsp. kilimandscharica	Kilimanjaro sugarbush		Mt Kenya
Leiocephalea	grassveld protea	Protea afra subsp. nyasea	Malawi sugarbush		Malawi
Leiocephalea	grassveld protea	Protea dracomontana	Drakensberg sugarbush		South Africa (Eastern Cape, Lesotho, KwaZulu-Natal and Free State)
Leiocephalea	grassveld protea	Protea nubigena	Cloud sugarbush		South Africa (KwaZulu-Natal)
Leiocephalea	grassveld protea	Protea parvula	Dainty sugarbush		Mpumalanga
Leiocephalea	grassveld protea	Protea petiolaris elegans	Sickle-leaf sugarbush		Angola, Democratic Republic of the Congo, Zambia and Zimbabwe.
Leiocephalea	grassveld protea	Protea petiolaris petiolaris	Sickle-leaf sugarbush		Malawi, Zambia and Zimbabwe.
Leiocephalea	grassveld protea	Protea simplex	Dwarf grassveld sugarbush		South Africa (Eswatini and Mpumalanga)
Leiocephalea	shaving-brush protea	Protea caffra kilimandscharica	Kilimanjaro sugarbush		DRC, Kenya, Tanzania, Uganda
Leiocephalea	shaving-brush protea	Protea caffra mafingensis	Mafingo sugarbush		Malawi and Zambia
Leiocephalea	shaving-brush protea	Protea rupicola	Krantz sugarbush		South Africa (Western and Eastern Cape)
Leiocephalea	shaving-brush protea	Protea glabra	Clanwilliam sugarbush		South Africa (Western cape)
Leiocephalea	shaving-brush protea	Protea inopina	Largenut sugarbush	Protea inopina 19247831	Paleisheuwel
Leiocephalea	shaving-brush protea	Protea nitida	Wagon tree		South Africa (Eastern Cape)
Ligulatae	spoon-bract protea	Protea burchellii	Burchell's sugarbush		South Africa (Southwestern Cape)
Ligulatae	spoon-bract protea	Protea compacta	Bot river sugarbush		Kleinmond to Bredasdorp Mountains South Africa
Ligulatae	spoon-bract protea	Protea eximia	Broadleaf sugarbush		South Africa (Western Cape)
Ligulatae	spoon-bract protea	Protea longifolia	Longleaf sugarbush		South Africa (Western Cape)
Ligulatae	spoon-bract protea	Protea obtusifolia	Limestone sugarbush		South Africa (Western Cape)
Ligulatae	spoon-bract protea	Protea pudens	Bashful sugarbush		South Africa (Western Cape)
Ligulatae	spoon-bract protea	Protea roupelliae hamiltonii	Dwarf silver sugarbush		South Africa (Western Cape), Zimbabwe
Ligulatae	spoon-bract protea	Protea roupelliae roupelliae	Silver sugarbush		Clanwilliam to Grahamstown, South Africa.
Ligulatae	spoon-bract protea	Protea susannae	Stinkleaf sugarbush		South Africa (Western Cape)
Melliferae	sugerbushes	Protea aristata	Ladismith sugarbush		South Africa (Western Cape)
Melliferae	sugerbushes	Protea lanceolata	Lanceleaf sugarbush		South Africa
Melliferae	sugerbushes	Protea repens	Common sugarbush		South Africa
Microgeantae	western ground protea	Protea acaulos	Common ground sugarbush		South Africa (Western Cape)
Microgeantae	western ground protea	Protea convexa	Largeleaf sugarbush		South Africa (Western Cape)
Microgeantae	western ground protea	Protea laevis	Smoothleaf sugarbush		South Africa (Western Cape)
Microgeantae	western ground protea	Protea revoluta	Rolledleaf sugarbush		South Africa (Western Cape)
Microgeantae	western ground protea	Protea angustata	Wide laef sugarbush		South Africa (Western Cape)
Obvallatae	bishop protea	Protea caespitosa	Bishop sugarbush		South Africa (Western Cape province)
Paludosae	rooi protea	Protea enervis	Chimanimani sugarbush		Zimbabwe and Mozambique
Paracynaroides	sneeu protea	Protea cryophila	Snowball protea		South Africa (Cederberg)
Paracynaroides	sneeu protea	Protea pruinosa	Frosted sugarbush		South Africa (Western Cape province)
Paracynaroides	sneeu protea	Protea scabriuscula	Hoary sugarbush		South Africa (Western Cape province)
Paracynaroides	sneeu protea	Protea scolopendriifolia	Hart's tonguefern sugarbush		South Africa (Western and Eastern Cape province)
Parviflorae	shale protea	Protea mucronifolia	Daggerleaf sugarbush		South Africa
Parviflorae	shale protea	Protea odorata	Swartland sugarbush		South Africa
Patentiflorae	mountain protea	Protea angolensis angolensis	Dwarf northernwoodland sugarbush		northern, central and eastern Zimbabwe
Patentiflorae	mountain protea	Protea angolensis divaricata	Northern woodland sugarbush		Zambia, western Angola, southern Democratic Republic of the Congo, Burundi, southern and western Tanzania, northern Malawi, and to a limited extent in Mozambique (Tete)
Patentiflorae	mountain protea	Protea comptonii	Saddleback sugarbush		South Africa (Mpumalanga and KwaZulu-Natal)
Patentiflorae	mountain protea	Protea curvata	Barberton sugarbush		South Africa
Patentiflorae	mountain protea	Protea laetans	Blyde sugarbush		South Africa (Mpumalanga)
Patentiflorae	mountain protea	Protea madiensis	Tall woodland sugarbush		Senegal to Ethiopia in the north, to Angola, Malawi, Mozambique and Zambia, Guinea to Mali in the north, south to Sierra Leone, Benin and Cameroon.
Patentiflorae	mountain protea	Protea rubropilosa	Transvaal sugarbush		South Africa (Mpumalanga and Limpopo)
Patentiflorae	mountain protea	Protea rupestris	Rocket sugarbush		Malawi, Mozambique, Angola and Tanzania
Pinifolia	rose protea	Protea acuminata	Blackrim sugarbush		South Africa
Pinifolia	rose protea	Protea canaliculata	Grooveleaf sugarbush		South Africa (Western Cape province)
Pinifolia	rose protea	Protea nana	Mountainrose sugarbush		South Africa (Western Cape province)
Pinifolia	rose protea	Protea pityphylla	Ceres sugarbush		South Africa (Western Cape province)
Pinifolia	rose protea	Protea scolymocephala	Thistle sugarbush		South Africa (Western Cape province)
Pinifolia	rose protea	Protea witzenbergiana	Swan sugarbush		South Africa (Western Cape province)
Protea	king protea	Protea cynaroides	King protea		South Africa
Speciosae	bearded sugerbush	Protea coronata	Green sugarbush		South Africa (Western and Eastern Cape)
Speciosae	bearded sugerbush	Protea grandiceps	Red sugarbush		South Africa (Cape Peninsula, Hottentots-Holland Mountains, Riviersonderend Mountains, Langeberg, Outeniqua Mountains, Winterhoek Mountains and Kamanassie Mountains)
Speciosae	bearded sugerbush	Protea holosericea	Sawedge sugarbush		South Africa (Western Cape)
Speciosae	bearded sugerbush	Protea laurifolia	Greyleaf sugarbush		South Africa (Northern and Western Cape)
Speciosae	bearded sugerbush	Protea lepidocarpodendron	Blackbeard sugarbush		South Africa (Western Cape)
Speciosae	bearded sugerbush	Protea lorifolia	Strapleaf sugarbush		South Africa (Swartberg, Riviersonderend and Langeberg Mountains, to the Baviaanskloofberge and Kouga Mountains.)
Speciosae	bearded sugerbush	Protea magnifica	Queen protea		South Africa (Western Cape)
Speciosae	bearded sugerbush	Protea neriifolia	Narrowleaf sugarbush		South Africa (Eastern and Western Cape)
Speciosae	bearded sugerbush	Protea speciosa	Brownbeard sugarbush		South Africa (Western Cape)
Speciosae	bearded sugerbush	Protea stokoei	Pink sugarbush		South Africa (Kogelberg and Greenland Mountains)
Subacaules	dwarf-tufted protea	Protea aspera	Roughleaf sugarbush		South Africa (Kleinrivier Mountains, Bredasdorpberg and Garcia's Pass.)
Subacaules	dwarf-tufted protea	Protea denticulata	Toothleaf sugarbush		South Africa
Subacaules	dwarf-tufted protea	Protea lorea	Thongleaf sugarbush		South Africa (Western Cape)
Subacaules	dwarf-tufted protea	Protea piscina	Visgat sugarbush		South Africa
Subacaules	dwarf-tufted protea	Protea restionifolia	Reedleaf sugarbush		South Africa (Western Cape province)
Subacaules	dwarf-tufted protea	Protea scabra	Sandpaperleaf sugarbush		South Africa (Hottentots Holland Mountains across the Riviersonderend Mountains, the Kleinrivier Mountains and around the town of Caledon to the Swartberg Mountains)
Subacaules	dwarf-tufted protea	Protea scorzonerifolia	Channelleaf sugarbush		South Africa (Western Cape)
