= Protea restionifolia =

Conservation status
- Vulnerable (IUCN 3.1)

Scientific classification
- Kingdom: Plantae
- Clade: Tracheophytes
- Clade: Angiosperms
- Clade: Eudicots
- Order: Proteales
- Family: Proteaceae
- Genus: Protea
- Species: P. restionifolia

Binomial name
- Protea restionifolia (Salisb. ex. Knight) Rycroft

Synonyms
- Protea echinulata Meisn.; Protea echinulata var. minor E.Phillips

Species of flowering shrub

Protea restionifolia, which is also known as the Reed-leaf sugarbush, is a flowering shrub endemic to the Western Cape province of South Africa where it is found from the upper part of the Breede River Valley through the Bot River Valley to Wolseley and the Koue Bokkeveld Mountains.

Other vernacular names which have been recorded for this species are grass-leaf sugarbush and restio-leaf erodendrum. In Afrikaans it is known as the bruingrondsuikerbos.

== Description ==
The shrub forms a dense root-like mat of rhizomes of up to one meter in diameter. This species has evolved to have thin, round reed-like leaves, very similar to the restios it shares its habitat with. P. restionifolia flowers in spring, blooming from August to October, peaking in September. The plant is monoecious with both sexes in each flower.

It is rarely confused with other species in the field, but is similar to P. piscina and P. revoluta. It can easily be distinguished from these species by having extremely narrow and hairy, as opposed to completely glabrous, leaves which are tightly rolled into round needles. Other similar species are P. scabra which has much broader leaves, P. lorea which has longer and glabrous needles as leaves, and P. scorzoneriifolia. The small yellow inflorescences ('flower-heads') are also distinctive.

== Ecology ==
According to some sources pollination probably occurs through rodents, although this is based on a single observation. Another newer source states that it is pollinated by birds and insects.

The plant sprouts again after burning from an underground bole. The seeds are released one to two years after flowers are formed and are spread by wind. The plant grows in dry areas in fynbos-karoo or fynbos-renosterveld at altitudes of 150-300 m.
