= Erica modesta =

Scientific classification
- Kingdom: Plantae
- Clade: Tracheophytes
- Clade: Angiosperms
- Clade: Eudicots
- Clade: Asterids
- Order: Ericales
- Family: Ericaceae
- Genus: Erica
- Species: E. modesta

Binomial name
- Erica modesta Salisb.

Synonyms
- Erica leucophylla Klotzsch; Ericoides modestum (Salisb.) Kuntze; Lamprotis modesta G.Don; Raspalia angulata E.Mey.

Species of flowering plant

Erica modesta is a plant belonging to the genus Erica and is part of the fynbos. The species is endemic to the Western Cape where it occurs on the Riviersonderend Mountains from Jonaskop to Galgeberg. There are four known populations. The species grows slowly and has a long life, there are rarely more than 50 plants together. The plant's habitat is threatened by the high incidence of veld fires and invasive plants such as pine trees.
