= Erica sicifolia =

Scientific classification
- Kingdom: Plantae
- Clade: Tracheophytes
- Clade: Angiosperms
- Clade: Eudicots
- Clade: Asterids
- Order: Ericales
- Family: Ericaceae
- Genus: Erica
- Species: E. sicifolia

Binomial name
- Erica sicifolia Salisb.

Synonyms
- Erica pygmaea Andrews; Erica sanguinolenta G.Lodd.; Ericoides sicifolium (Salisb.) Kuntze

Species of flowering plant

Erica sicifolia is a plant belonging to the genus Erica and is part of the fynbos. The species is endemic to the Western Cape and occurs in the Riviersonderend Mountains. There are four subpopulations and they are threatened by pine trees, an invasive plant.
