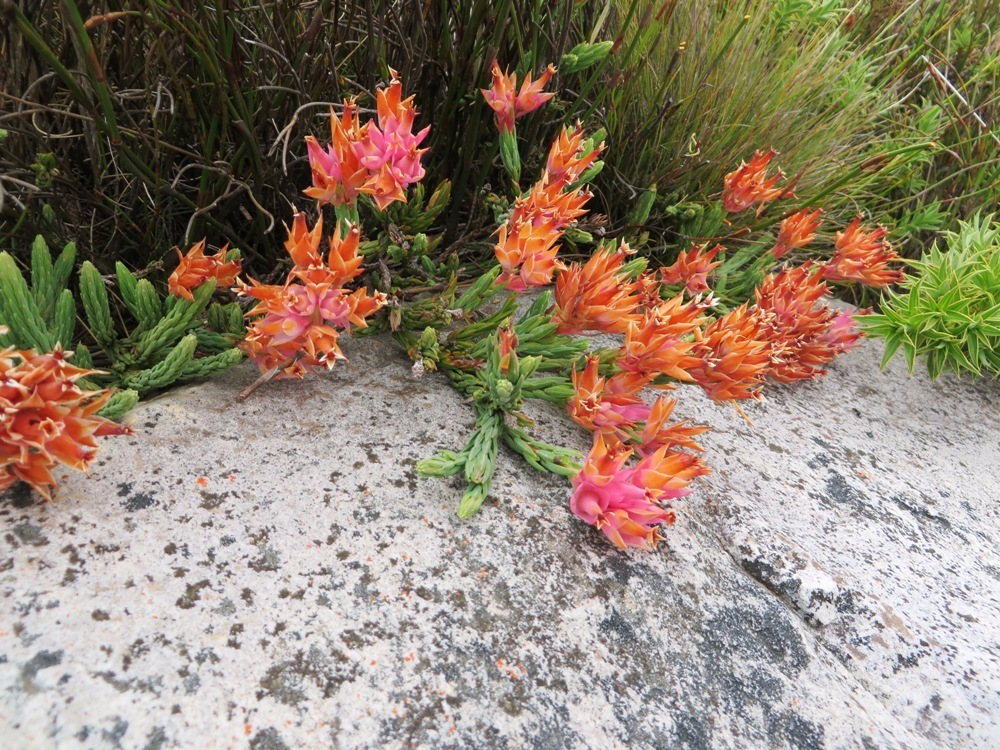

Scientific classification
- Kingdom: Plantae
- Clade: Tracheophytes
- Clade: Angiosperms
- Clade: Eudicots
- Clade: Asterids
- Order: Ericales
- Family: Ericaceae
- Genus: Erica
- Species: E. alfredii

Binomial name
- Erica alfredii Guthrie & Bolus

= Erica alfredii =

Species of flowering plant

Erica alfredii is a plant belonging to the genus Erica and forming part of the fynbos. The species is endemic to the Western Cape and occurs at Pilaarkop, Riviersonderend Mountains. There is one population of less than 1 000 plants and their habitat is threatened by invasive plants.
