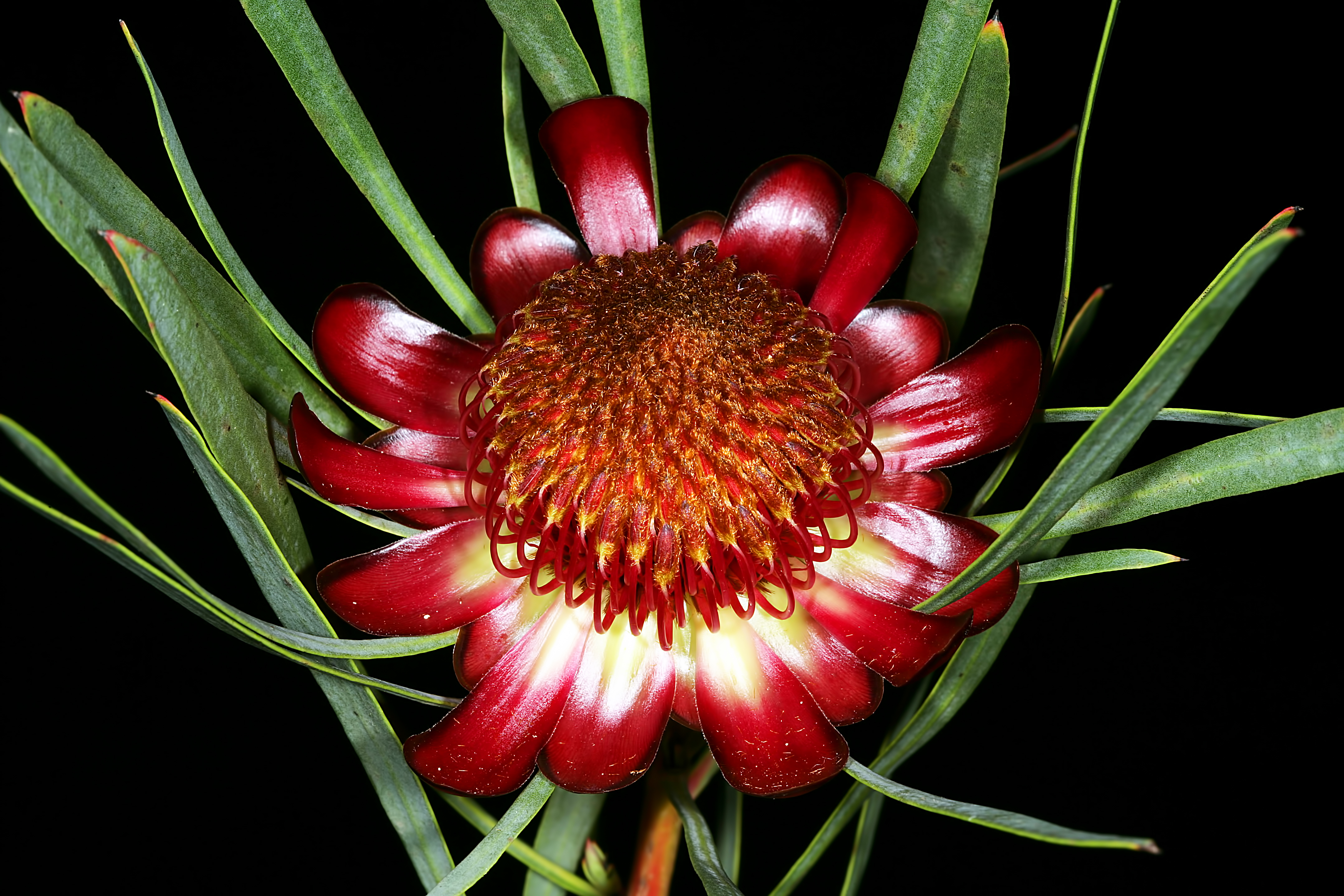
- Protea acuminata in South Africa

Conservation status
- Least Concern (IUCN 3.1)

Scientific classification
- Kingdom: Plantae
- Clade: Embryophytes
- Clade: Tracheophytes
- Clade: Angiosperms
- Clade: Eudicots
- Order: Proteales
- Family: Proteaceae
- Genus: Protea
- Species: P. acuminata

Binomial name
- Protea acuminata Sims

= Protea acuminata =

Species of flowering plant

Protea acuminata, also known in English as the black-rim sugarbush, or in the Afrikaans language as sederbergsuikerbos, is a flowering shrub belonging to the genus Protea. The plant is endemic to South Africa. There are isolated populations at Nieuwoudtville, and in the Cederberg, Stettynskloof and Riviersonderend Mountains. It can grow as an upright tree. It can become up to two metres in height. It blooms from June to September, with the peak of July to August. Periodic wildfires may destroy the adult plants, but the seeds can survive such an event. The seeds are dispersed by means of the wind. The plant is monoecious with both sexes in each flower. It is unknown what causes the pollination to occur. The plant grows in sandy plains and coastal lowlands from sea-level to altitudes of 400 metres (1,300 ft). It is a widespread species which is not in danger, and the conservation status has been assessed as 'least concern' (as of 2019).
