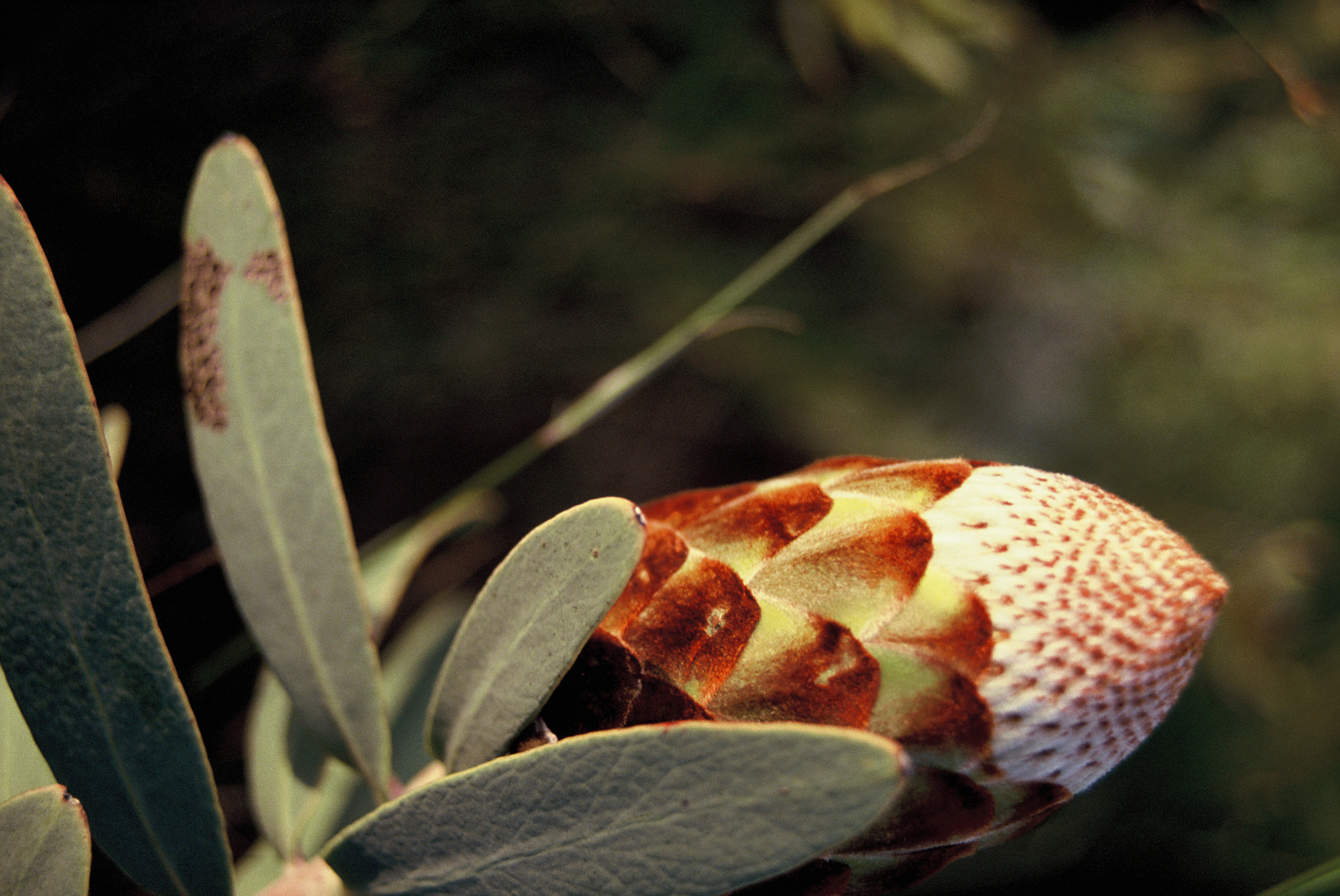

Conservation status
- Critically Endangered (IUCN 3.1)

Scientific classification
- Kingdom: Plantae
- Clade: Tracheophytes
- Clade: Angiosperms
- Clade: Eudicots
- Order: Proteales
- Family: Proteaceae
- Genus: Protea
- Species: P. inopina

Binomial name
- Protea inopina Rourke

= Protea inopina =

Species of plant

Protea inopina, the large-nut sugarbush, is a flowering shrub belonging to the well-known Protea genus. The plant is endemic to the Western Cape, rare, extremely isolated and occurs only in the Olifants River mountains near Palace Hill.

== Description ==
The plant grows 1 m tall and has many stems. It blooms from September to December. The plant sprouts again after it has burned. The seeds are stored in a shell and spread by the wind. The plant is unisexual. Pollination takes place through the action of birds. The plant grows in sandstone soil at altitudes of 600 - 650 m.

== See also ==
- List of Protea species
