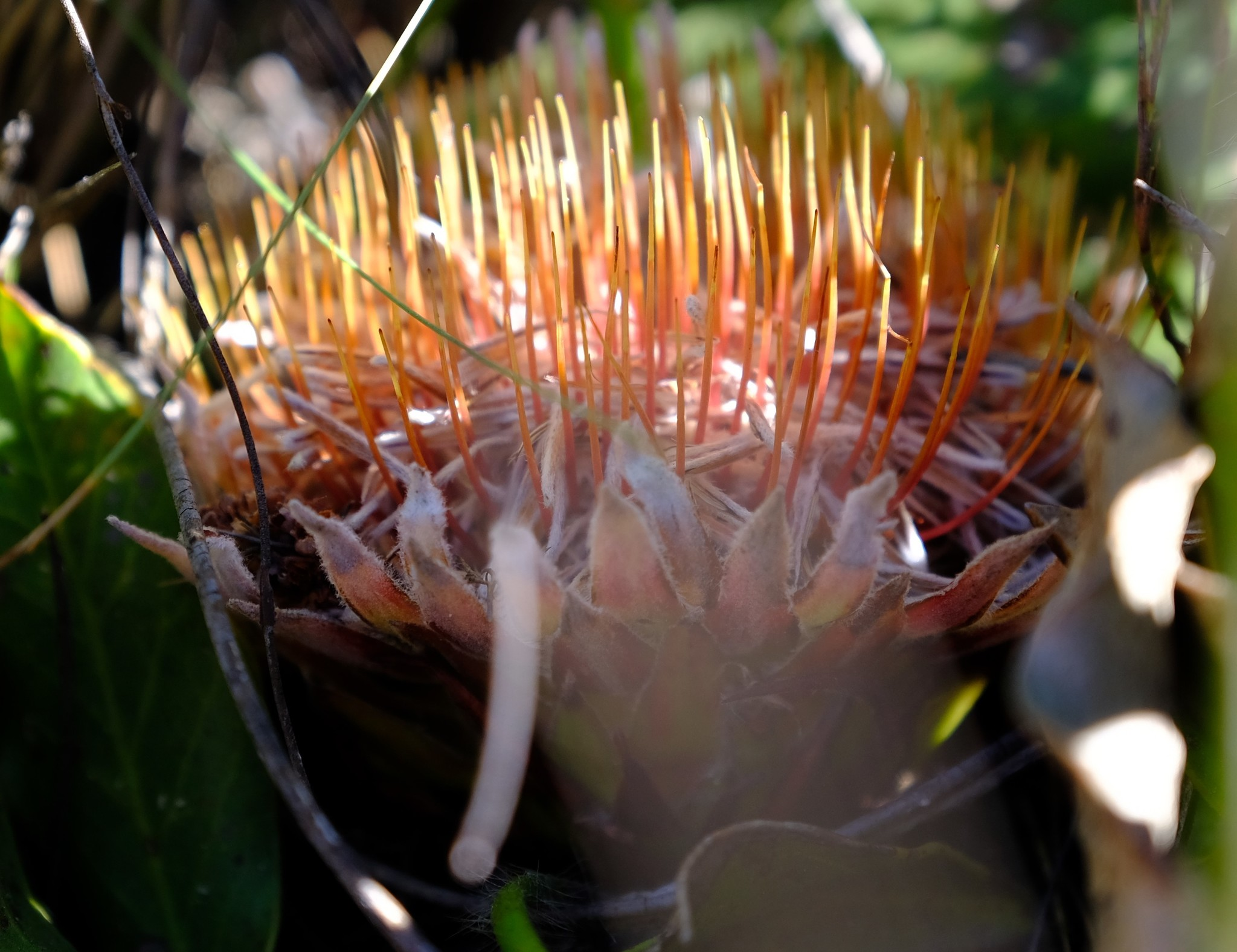

Conservation status
- Least Concern (IUCN 3.1)

Scientific classification
- Kingdom: Plantae
- Clade: Embryophytes
- Clade: Tracheophytes
- Clade: Angiosperms
- Clade: Eudicots
- Order: Proteales
- Family: Proteaceae
- Genus: Protea
- Species: P. scolopendriifolia

Binomial name
- Protea scolopendriifolia (Salisb. ex. Knight) Rourke

= Protea scolopendriifolia =

Species of flowering plant

Protea scolopendriifolia, also known as the harts-tongue-fern sugarbush or hart's-tongue-fern sugarbush, is a flowering shrub endemic to South Africa, where it occurs in both the Western and Eastern Cape. It is found from the Cederberg, through the Kogelberg, Riviersonderend Mountains and Swartberg, to the Kouga Mountains. It blooms in Spring, from September to December.

It produces underground rhizomes from which shoots bud off, especially after wildfires. The whole plant that emerges from these rhizomes can be up to 1 metre (3 ft 3 in) across. The seed is retained in the seed-head for a considerable time, before being released and scattered by the wind. Each flower has both male and female parts. Pollination occurs through the action of rodents. It grows on Cederberg shale, sometimes on sandstone soils at altitudes varying from 450 to 1,800 m (1,480 to 5,910 ft).

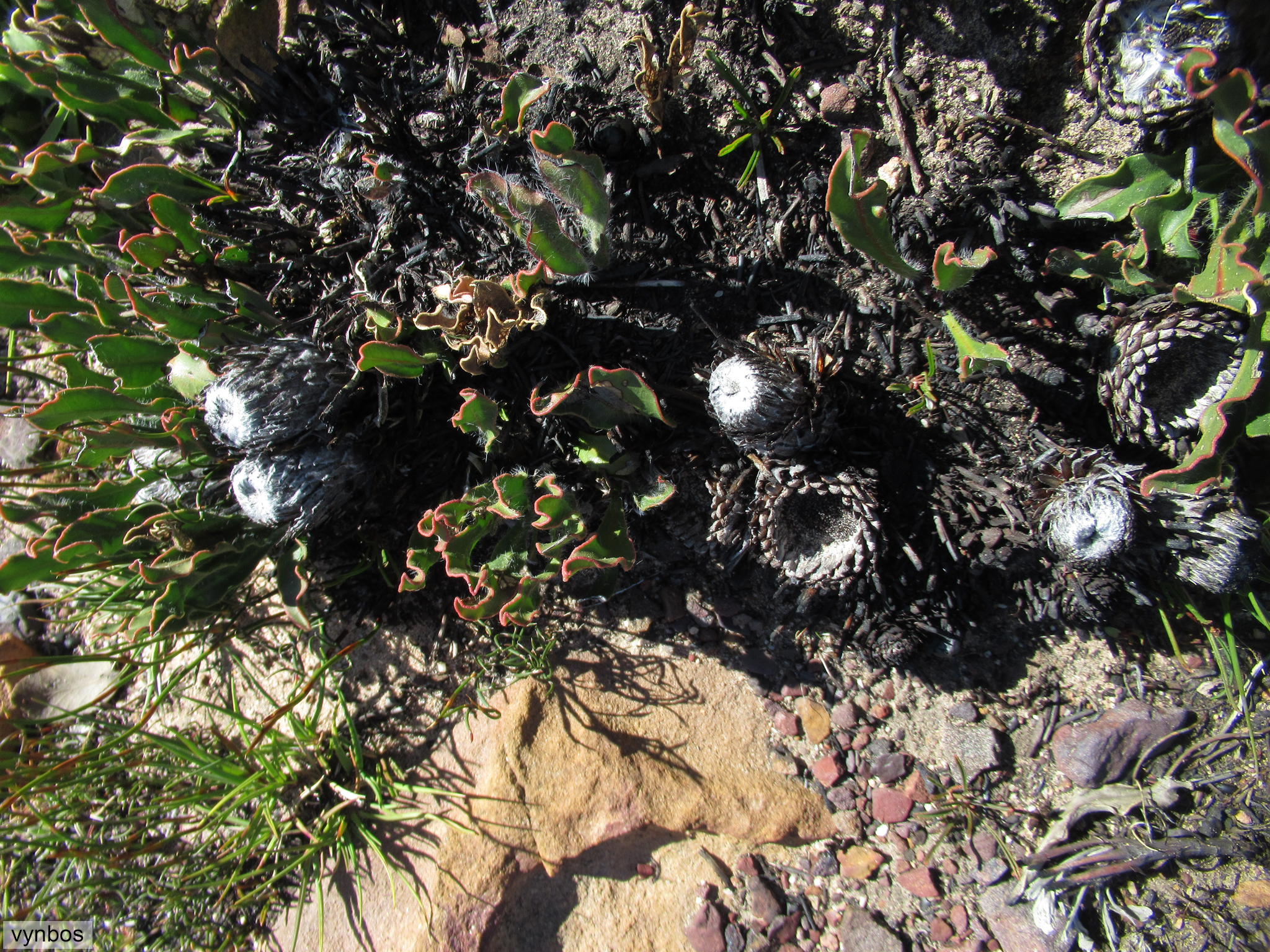
Protea scolopendriifolia after having been burnt in mid-spring, in October
