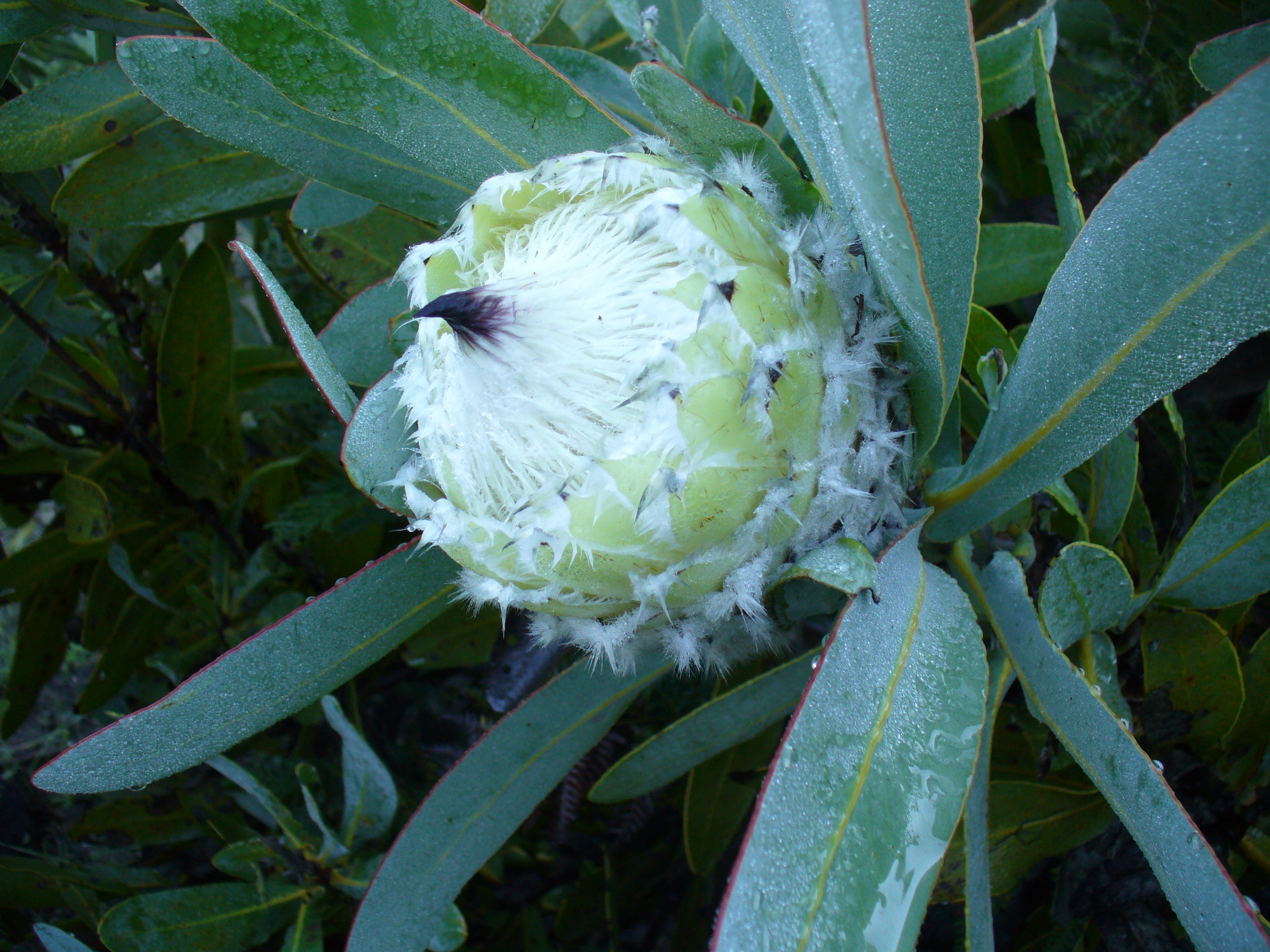
- Protea magnifica developing inflorescence

Conservation status
- Least Concern (IUCN 3.1)

Scientific classification
- Kingdom: Plantae
- Clade: Embryophytes
- Clade: Tracheophytes
- Clade: Angiosperms
- Clade: Eudicots
- Order: Proteales
- Family: Proteaceae
- Genus: Protea
- Species: P. magnifica

Binomial name
- Protea magnifica Link

Synonyms
- Protea barbigera Meisn.; Scolymocephalus barbiger (Meisn.) Kuntze

= Protea magnifica =

Species of flowering plant

Protea magnifica, commonly known as the queen protea, is a shrub, which belongs to the genus Protea within the family Proteaceae, and which is native to South Africa.

The species is also called queen sugarbush, bearded sugarbush or woolly beard. In the Afrikaans language the vernacular names baardprotea, baardsuikerbos, baard-suikerbos, koninginprotea, suikerbosprotea, wolbaardsuikerbos and wolbaard-suikerbos have all been recorded for the plant.

== Taxonomy ==
The International Plant Names Index attributes the authorship of Protea magnifica to Henry Cranke Andrews, but the South African National Biodiversity Institute attributes it to Johann Heinrich Friedrich Link.

== Description ==
It grows either as an erect or as a sprawling shrub, growing up to 2.5 metres (8.2 ft) in height. The inflorescences are specialised structures called pseudanthia, also known simply as flower heads, containing hundred of reduced flowers, called florets. It is monoecious, both sexes occur in each flower. It blooms in spring, from June to January. The fruit, containing a seed, is kept within the old, dried infructescence which is retained persistently on the plant.

== Distribution ==
This plant is endemic to the Cape Region of South Africa, where it only occurs in the Western Cape province. It occurs in the Koue Bokkeveld to Hottentots Holland, Klein Swartberg, Riviersonderend, Franschhoek and central Langeberg mountain ranges. It is spatially distributed as isolated stands.

== Ecology ==
It is pollinated by birds. The wildfires which periodically move through the land in which the shrub grows destroy the adult plants, but the seeds can survive such an event. When released, the seeds are dispersed by means of the wind.

=== Habitat ===
It grows high in the mountains on hot, dry mountain slopes near the snow line, at altitudes between 1,200 and 2,700 metres (3,900 and 8,900 ft). It exclusively occurs in a fynbos habitat, but it occur in many different sub-types of this general habitat. It usually grows in substrates derived of sandstone, but may sometimes grow on quartzite.

== Uses ==
This the most prized cut flower in the trade. In 1998, the best flower heads were still said come from the wild, and were often harvested for this purpose.

== Conservation ==
Protea magnifica is not threatened, and is locally common. As of 2019 the total population numbers were believed to be stable. The South African National Biodiversity Institute first assessed this species for the Red List of South African Plants in 2009, rating the conservation status as least concern. In 2019 this assessment was reiterated.
