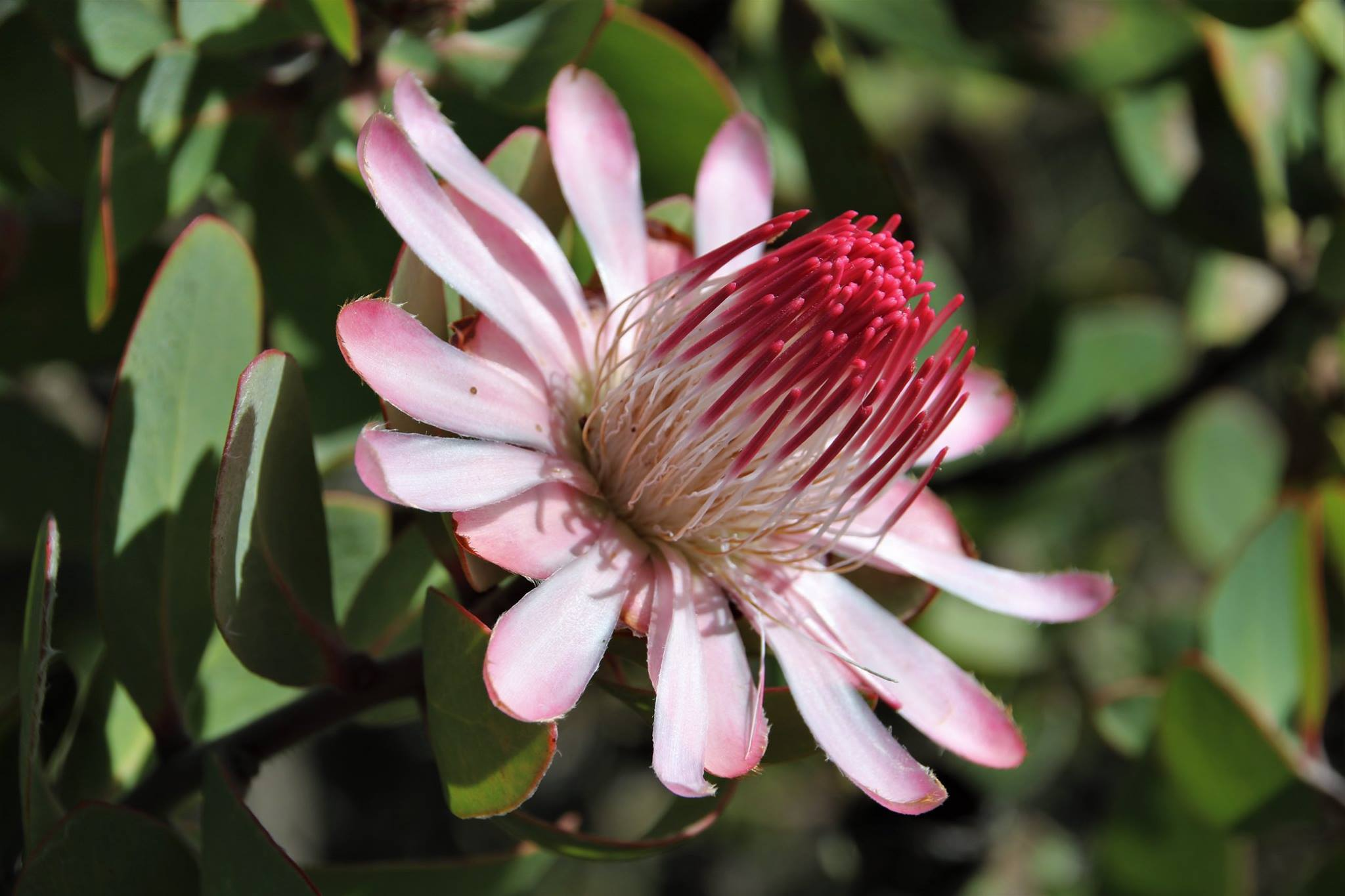
- Protea punctata on the Swartberg Pass in South Africa

Conservation status
- Least Concern (IUCN 3.1)

Scientific classification
- Kingdom: Plantae
- Clade: Tracheophytes
- Clade: Angiosperms
- Clade: Eudicots
- Order: Proteales
- Family: Proteaceae
- Genus: Protea
- Species: P. punctata

Binomial name
- Protea punctata Meisn.

Synonyms
- Scolymocephalus coriaceus Kuntze; Protea coriacea Buek; Protea carlescens E.Mey. ex. Meisn., nom. nud.

= Protea punctata =

Species of flowering plant

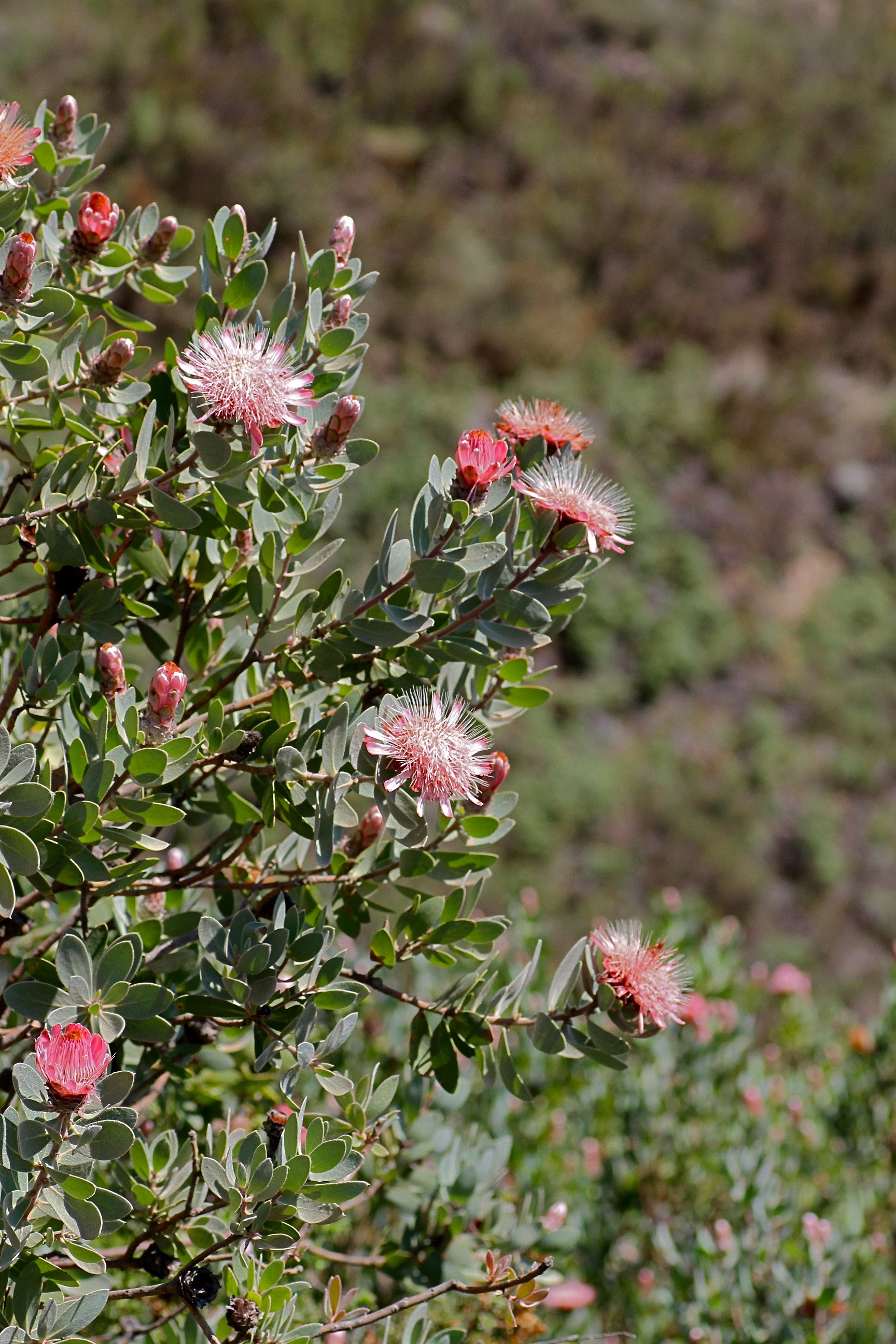
Protea punctata in the Swartberg Nature Reserve, South Africa.

Protea punctata, also known as the water sugarbush or water white sugarbush, is a shrub belonging to the genus Protea which is found growing in the wild in South Africa.

In Afrikaans this species is known by the vernacular names of water-witsuikerbos, witsuikerbos or angeliersuikerbos.

The tree's national number 94.1.

== Taxonomy ==
The species Protea punctata was first described by Carl Daniel Friedrich Meissner in mid-October 1856, in the Prodromus Systematis Naturalis Regni Vegetabilis, initiated by Augustin Pyramus de Candolle.

As related by Meissner in the same work, the synonym P. carlescens was introduced as a misspelling of P. coriacea given as taxon name to the specimens which were collected by Johann Franz Drège in the mountains of the Cape in the herbarium of Heinrich Wilhelm Buek, because he noted that the localities recorded for P. coriacea in the 1843 list provided by Drège were identical.

== Description ==
The shrub is large and erect, growing up to four metres in height. The leaves are quite broad. It blooms from the late summer to the early winter, from December to June, but mainly in the autumn from March to April. The plant is monoecious with both sexes in each flower. The fruit is persistent.

== Distribution ==
It is endemic to South Africa, although it occurs in both the Eastern and Western Cape provinces. The plant is found from the Cederberg to the Riviersonderend Mountains, and in the Swartberg, Baviaanskloof, Kammanassie and Kouga Mountains. It can be seen in the Swartberg Pass.

== Ecology ==
The plant grows in seeps in shale or sandstone-derived soils, at altitudes of 1,200 to 2,000 metres. The type of habitat it is found in is usually fynbos of many different types, but it has also been found growing on shales.

The mature plants die after the wildfires which occur in their native region, but the seeds can survive such events. Pollination occurs through the action of birds. The seeds are stored in a cap and released after they are ripe. They are dispersed by means of the wind.

The adults of the Table Mountain pride butterfly (Aeropetes tulbaghia) sometimes feed from the flowers.

== Conservation ==
It is not threatened. The population numbers are believed to be stable. The South African National Biodiversity Institute assessed the conservation status of the species as 'least concern' in 2009, and again in 2019.
