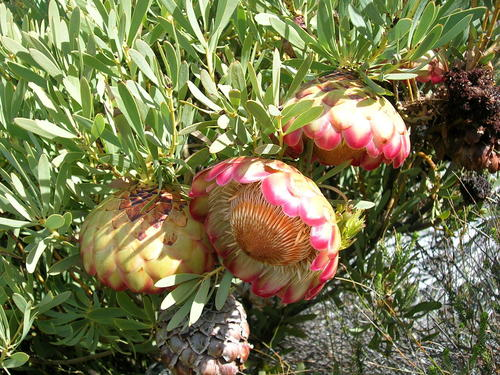
- Protea namaquana flowering in the winter, in August

Conservation status
- Critically Endangered (IUCN 3.1)

Scientific classification
- Kingdom: Plantae
- Clade: Embryophytes
- Clade: Tracheophytes
- Clade: Angiosperms
- Clade: Eudicots
- Order: Proteales
- Family: Proteaceae
- Genus: Protea
- Species: P. namaquana

Binomial name
- Protea namaquana Rourke

= Protea namaquana =

Species of flowering plant

Protea namaquana, also known as the Kamiesberg sugarbush, is a flowering plant which belongs to the genus Protea. The plant is endemic to the southwestern Cape Region of South Africa, in particular the Kamiesberg mountains of Namaqualand in the Northern Cape province. The species has a worldwide distribution of only 18 km^{2} (6.9 sq mi). It is regarded as critically endangered. In the Afrikaans language it has the vernacular name is Kamiesbergsuikerbos.

== Gallery ==
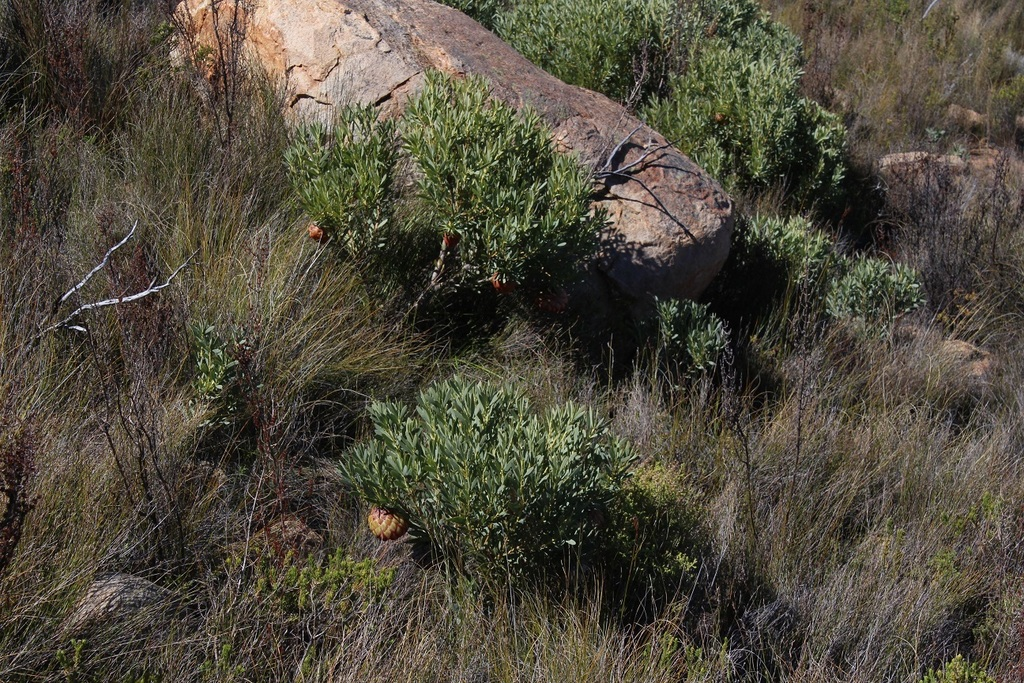
Protea namaquana habitus

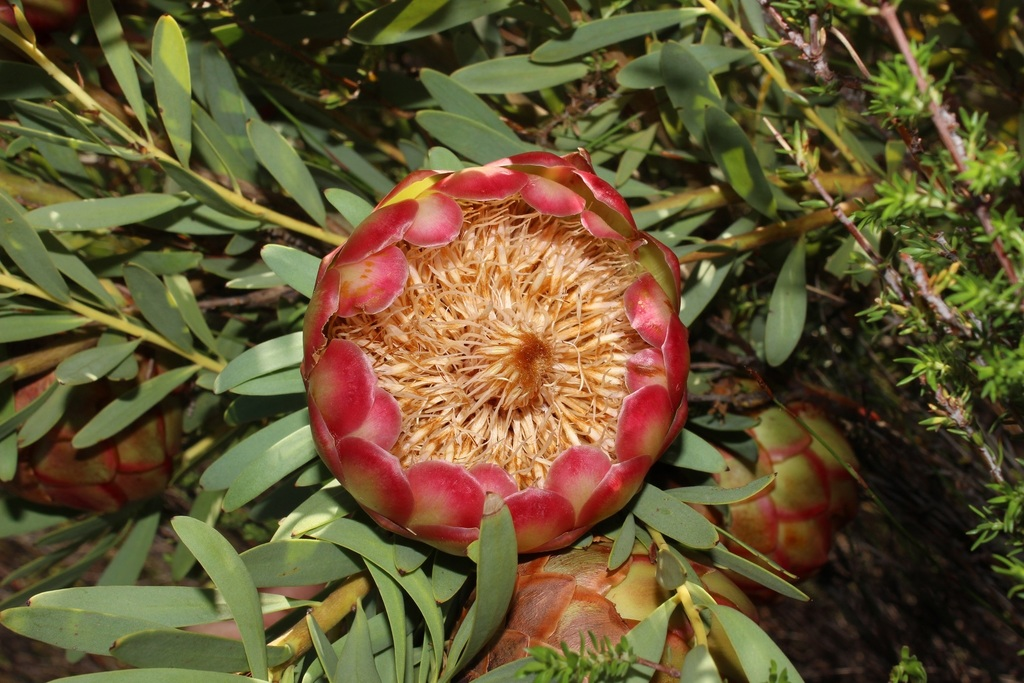
Protea namaquana flower

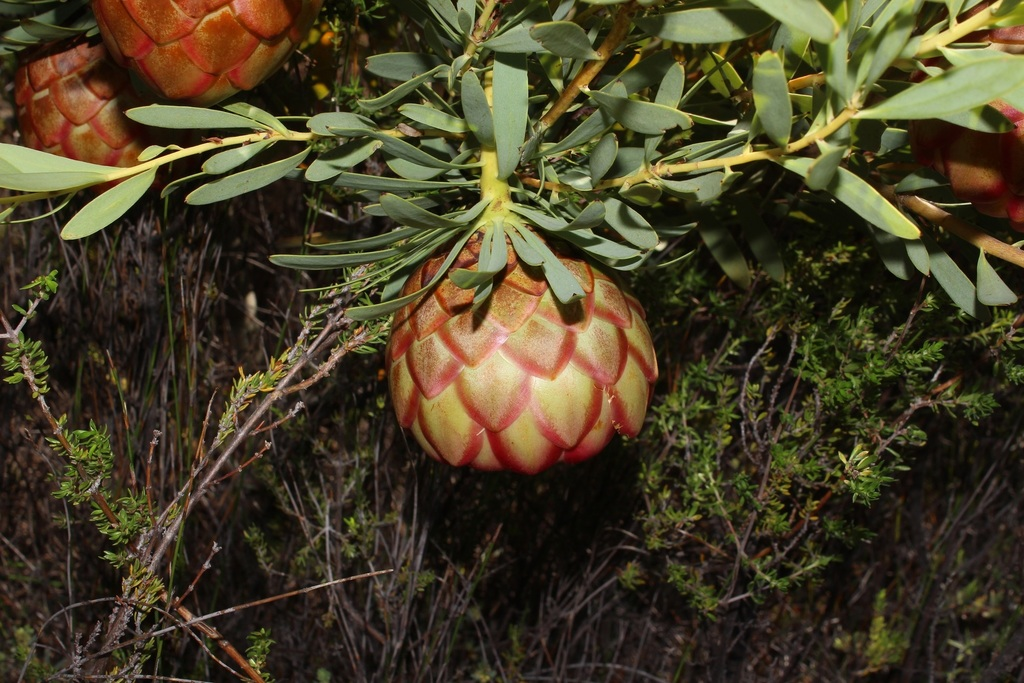
Protea namaquana flower

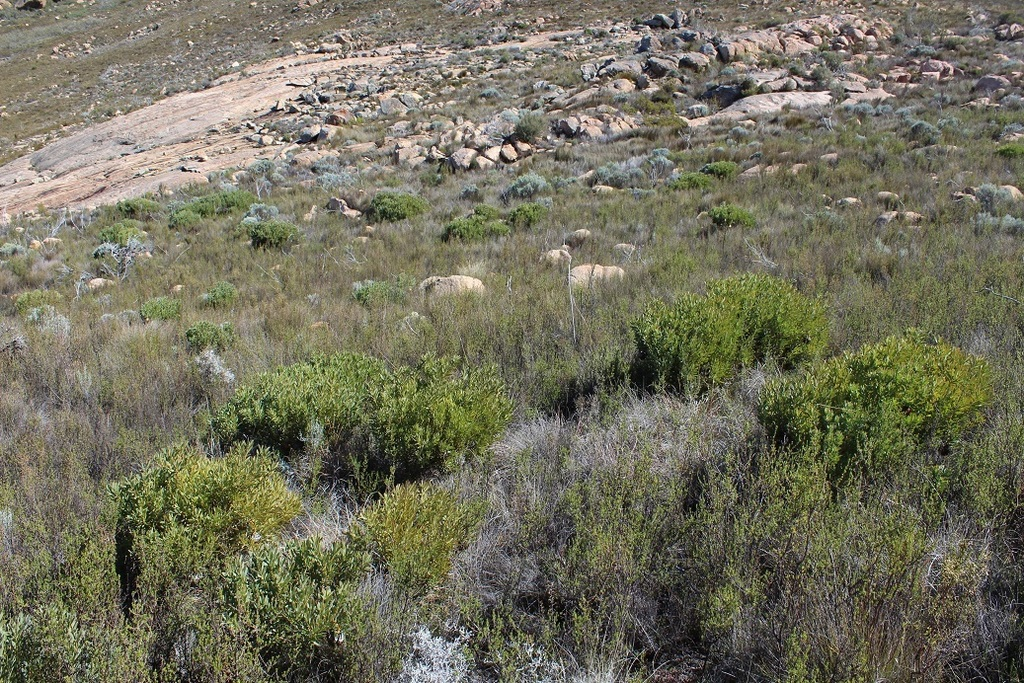
Protea namaquana habitat

== See also ==
- List of Southern African indigenous trees and woody lianes
- List of Protea species
