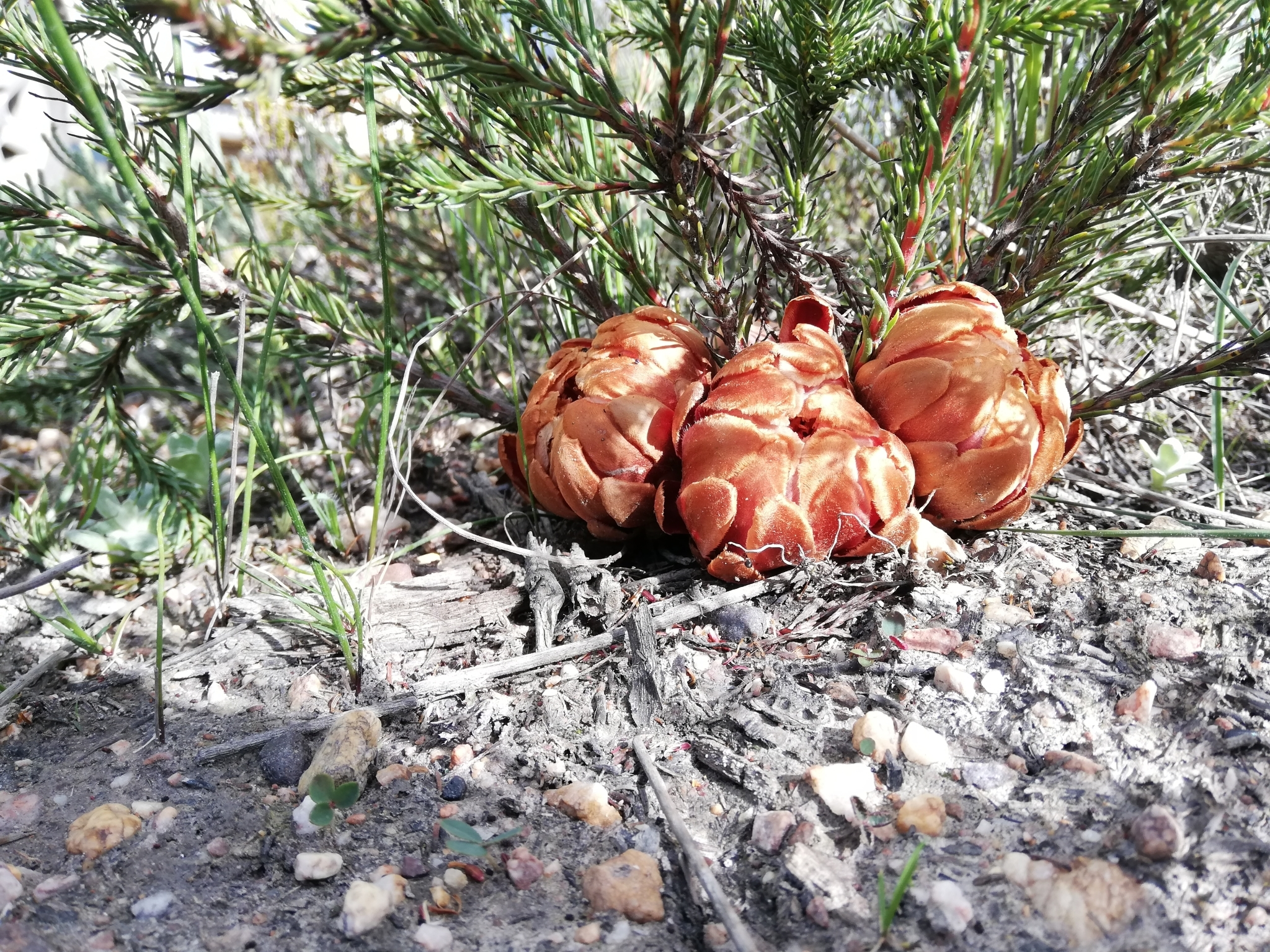

Conservation status
- Least Concern (IUCN 3.1)

Scientific classification
- Kingdom: Plantae
- Clade: Tracheophytes
- Clade: Angiosperms
- Clade: Eudicots
- Order: Proteales
- Family: Proteaceae
- Genus: Protea
- Species: P. subulifolia

Binomial name
- Protea subulifolia (Salisb. ex Knight) Rourke

Synonyms
- Pleuranthe subulifolia Knignt; Protea acerosa R.Br.; Scolymocephalus acerosus Kuntze

= Protea subulifolia =

Species of flowering plant

Protea subulifolia, the awl-leaf sugarbush, is a flower-bearing shrub belonging to the Protea genus. The plant is native to the Western Cape and occurs from the Stettynskloof to Riviersonderendberge, Langeberg, Bot River to the Elim plain. The plant grows 50 cm in diameter and 70 cm tall and flowers from July to September.

Fire destroys the plant but the seeds survive. The seeds are stored in a shell and spread by the wind. The plant is unisexual. Pollination takes place through the action of rats and mice. The plant grows in sandy to heavy clay soils at heights of 60-1 300 m. The leaves are very variable, needle-like to grooved-round. Involucral bracts are softly papery, brown or pink.

In Afrikaans it is known as Naaldblaarsuikerbos.
