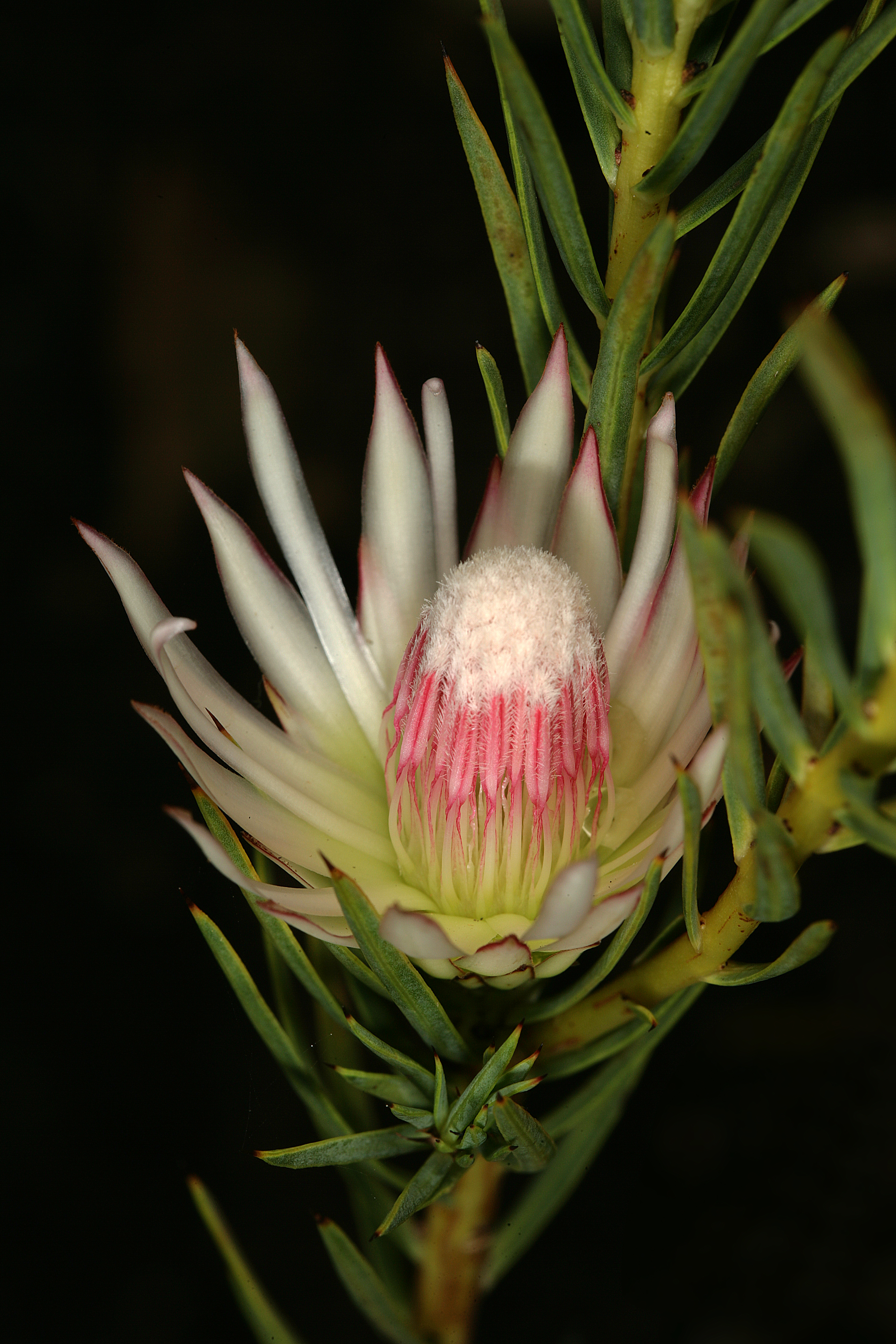

Conservation status
- Endangered (IUCN 3.1)

Scientific classification
- Kingdom: Plantae
- Clade: Tracheophytes
- Clade: Angiosperms
- Clade: Eudicots
- Order: Proteales
- Family: Proteaceae
- Genus: Protea
- Species: P. mucronifolia

Binomial name
- Protea mucronifolia Salisb.

Synonyms
- Erodendrum mucronifolium Knight; Protea odoratissima Masson ex R.Br.; Scolymocephalus mucronifolius Kuntze

= Protea mucronifolia =

Species of plant

Protea mucronifolia, the dagger-leaf sugarbush, is a flower-bearing shrub belonging to the Protea genus. The plant is endemic to the Western Cape where it occurs from Hermon to Saron. This is the only population. The shrub grows upright and grows 1 m tall and flowers from October to January with the peak from November to December.

A fire destroys the plant but the seeds survive. The seeds are still in a shell, released only after fire and spread by the wind. The plant is unisexual. Pollination takes place through the action of insects. The plant grows on gravelly Klipheuwel soil at heights of 80 m.

In Afrikaans it is known as the kasteelkloofsuikerbos.
