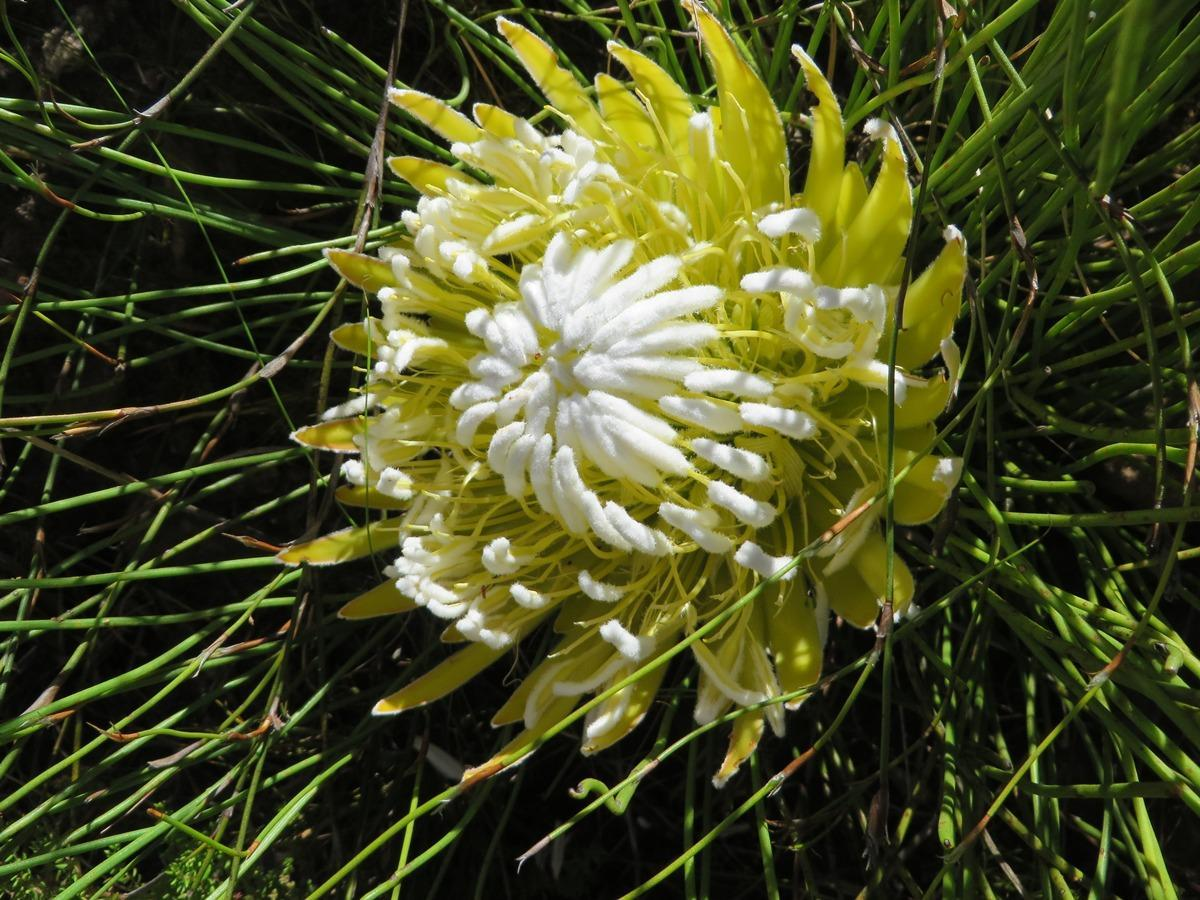

Conservation status
- Near Threatened (IUCN 3.1)

Scientific classification
- Kingdom: Plantae
- Clade: Embryophytes
- Clade: Tracheophytes
- Clade: Angiosperms
- Clade: Eudicots
- Order: Proteales
- Family: Proteaceae
- Genus: Protea
- Species: P. lorea

Binomial name
- Protea lorea R.Br.

= Protea lorea =

Species of flowering plant

Protea lorea, also known as the thong-leaf sugarbush, is a flowering shrub belonging to the genus Protea.

In Afrikaans it is known as sneeugrondsuikerbos.

== Taxonomy ==
Protea lorea was first described by Robert Brown in his 1810 treatise On the Proteaceae of Jussieu, from specimens collected by Francis Masson near the Cape of Good Hope in the early 1770s, and at that time in the herbarium collection of Joseph Banks.

== Description ==
The shrub forms a low mat of one metre in diameter. It blooms in the summer, from January to February, with its large, yellow inflorescences appearing at ground level from small tufts of grass-like leaves. The plant is hermaphroditic, with both sexes in each flower. Pollination probably occurs through the action of birds. The fruits are woody and persistent, which means they are retained on the plant after senescence. The seeds are kept within the dry fruit for a long period, they are released one to two years after the flowers were formed, and are spread through means of the wind.

It is easily mistaken for the reed-like type of plants known as restios, with which it shares its habitat, and thus has often been overlooked in surveys of local flora.

== Distribution ==
Protea lorea is endemic to South Africa, where it is only found in the Western Cape, from the Wemmershoek Mountains through the mountains of Kogelberg, Riviersonderend, Langeberg, and the Hottentots Holland Mountains of the Helderberg region, to the towns of Ceres and Caledon.

Plants are spatially distributed as scattered individuals in localised areas.

== Ecology ==
Protea lorea grows on the grassy lower slopes of mountains, in shale or sandstone-derived soils, and at altitudes of 450 to 650 m (1,480 to 2,130 ft). It grows in the habitat known as fynbos.

The plant is able to re-sprout again from its underground rhizome after being burnt off in wildfires.

== Conservation ==
It is a rare species, and the status of the population was first assessed to be 'near threatened' in 2009 (assessed again as the same in 2019), although the population numbers are believed to be stable. It has a total area of occupancy of around 82 km^{2} (32 sq mi), consisting of only twelve known localities. These areas could in the future potentially be threatened by agriculture, afforestation and invasion by alien plants.
