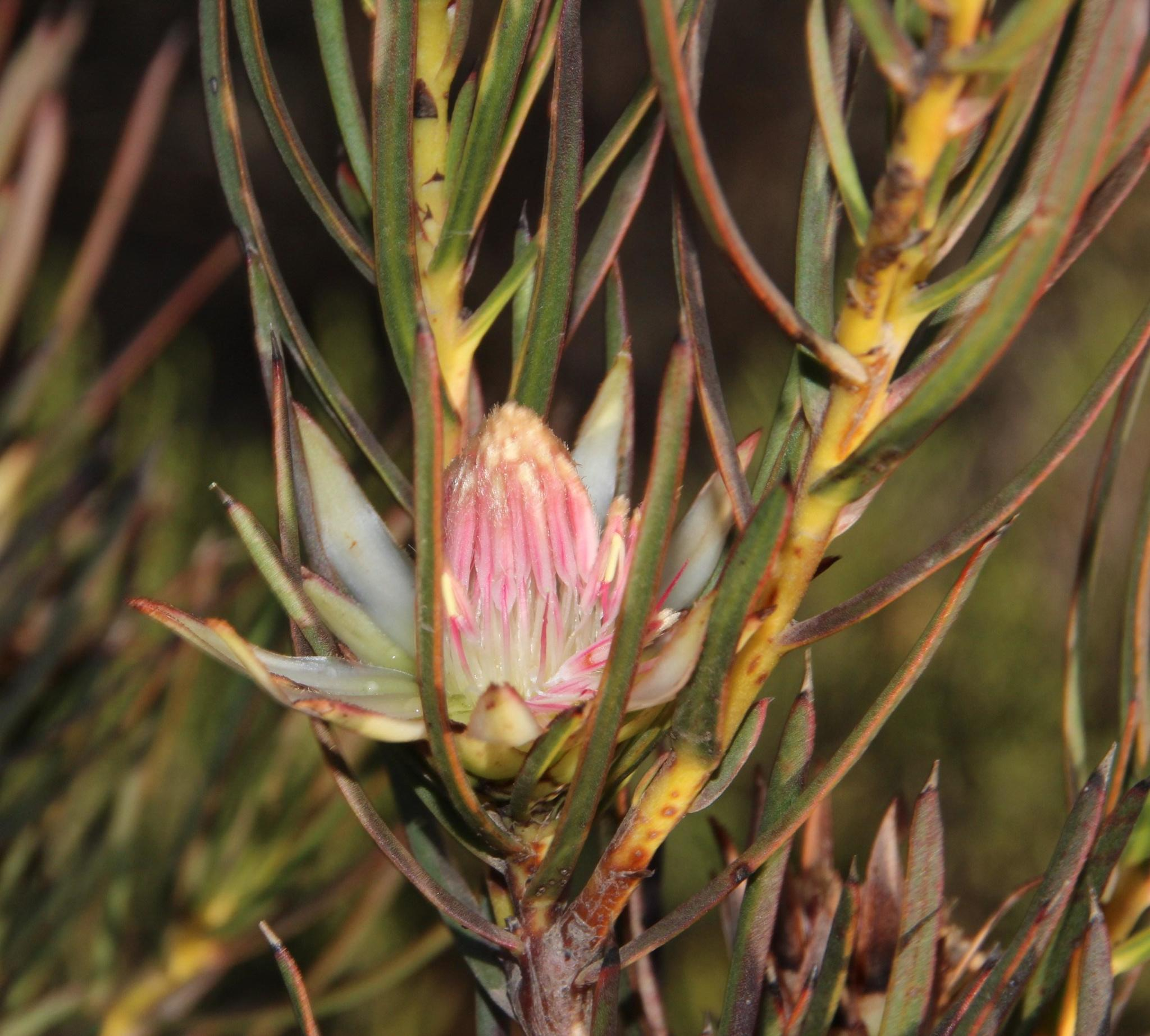

Conservation status
- Critically Endangered (IUCN 3.1)

Scientific classification
- Kingdom: Plantae
- Clade: Tracheophytes
- Clade: Angiosperms
- Clade: Eudicots
- Order: Proteales
- Family: Proteaceae
- Genus: Protea
- Species: P. odorata

Binomial name
- Protea odorata Thunb.

= Protea odorata =

Species of flowering plant

Protea odorata (Swartland Sugarbush) is a small, sparsely branched, unisexual evergreen shrub that grows up to 1.5 metres tall. It has light green branches that turn brown with age and produce leaves that are upward or arched like leaves. The leaves are hairless and have a curved back and tips that can easily hurt the hand when touched. The leaves become black with age and the spines are pink or reddish in young years, but turn brown with age.

The shrub is endemic to the Western Cape, where it is distributed from Kalbaskraal to Klapmuts. With only a few individuals left, the plant is classified as critically endangered.

It forms a large bowl - a flower head with a long, narrow, white flower body and a small, round, yellowish-brown head. And it has a modified tip of about 4 mm in length, which carries pollen to the opening, so-called pollen press. Males and females bear the same bloom, but the male is made up of stamens and anthers, and the female is made up of ovary, pollen and a stigma. The plant flowers from February to June, albeit the peak is from March to April. The seeds of the shrub are stored in a shell which is only released after fire, with the seeds being spread by rodents and ants. The plant is pollinated by wasps.
