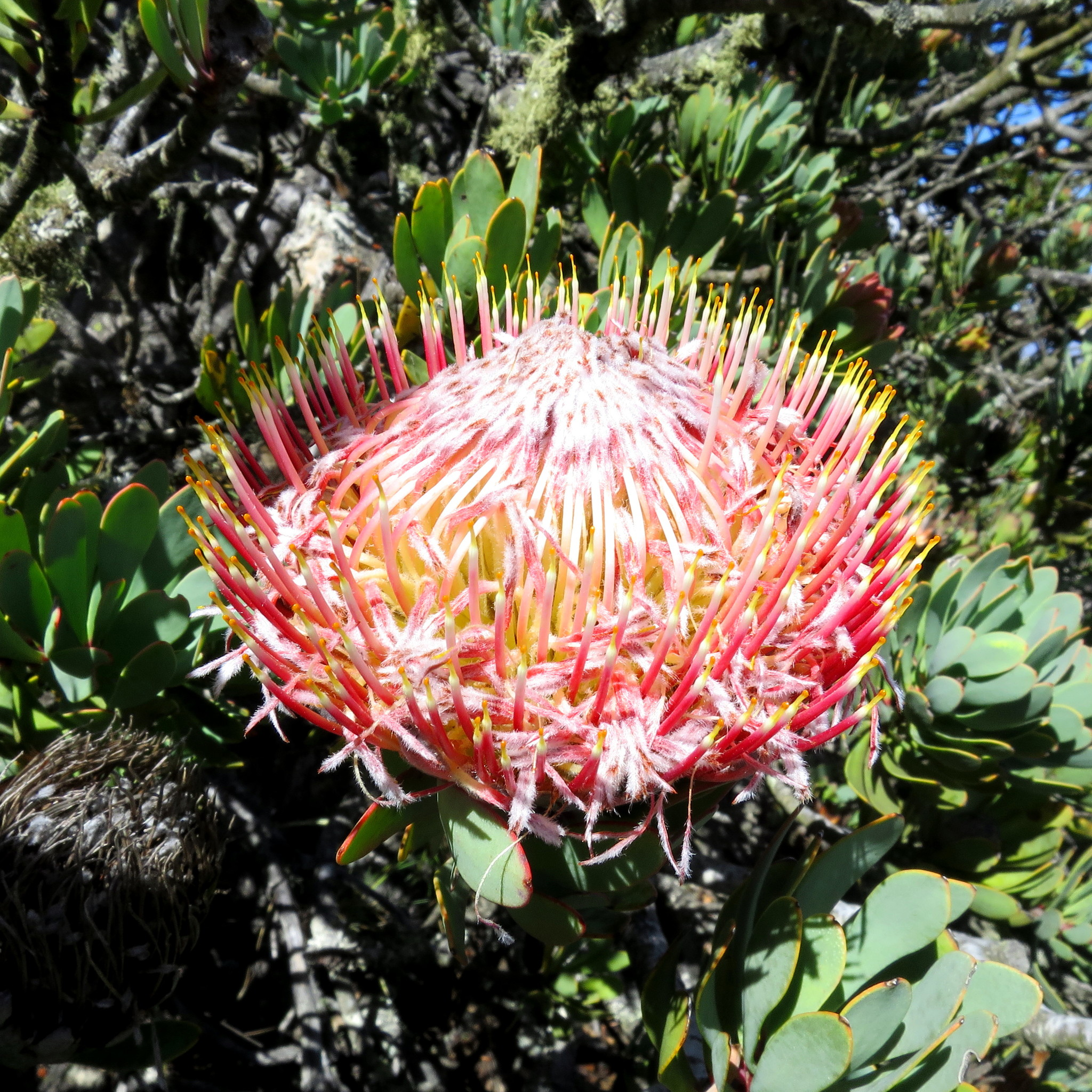

Conservation status
- Endangered (SANBI Red List)

Scientific classification
- Kingdom: Plantae
- Clade: Tracheophytes
- Clade: Angiosperms
- Clade: Eudicots
- Order: Proteales
- Family: Proteaceae
- Genus: Protea
- Species: P. rupicola

Binomial name
- Protea rupicola Mund ex. Meisn.

Synonyms
- Protea dykei E.Phillips

= Protea rupicola =

Species of flowering shrub

Protea rupicola, also known as the krantz sugarbush, is a flowering shrub belonging to the genus Protea. It has a highly branched trunk and grows up to 2m high.

In Afrikaans it is known as the kranssuikerbos.

== Distribution ==
The plant is endemic to South Africa, where it is native to the Western Cape and the Eastern Cape. The plant is only found extremely localized near mountain tops, from in the mountain ranges of Groot Winterhoek and Klein Winterhoek through the Hottentots Holland Mountains and Langeberg in the Western Cape, to the part of the Groot Swartberg mountains which lies in the Eastern Cape.

== Ecology ==
It is a rare plant. It prefers sandstone, crest reefs and rock slopes, at heights of 1,300 to 2,000 m above sea level.
