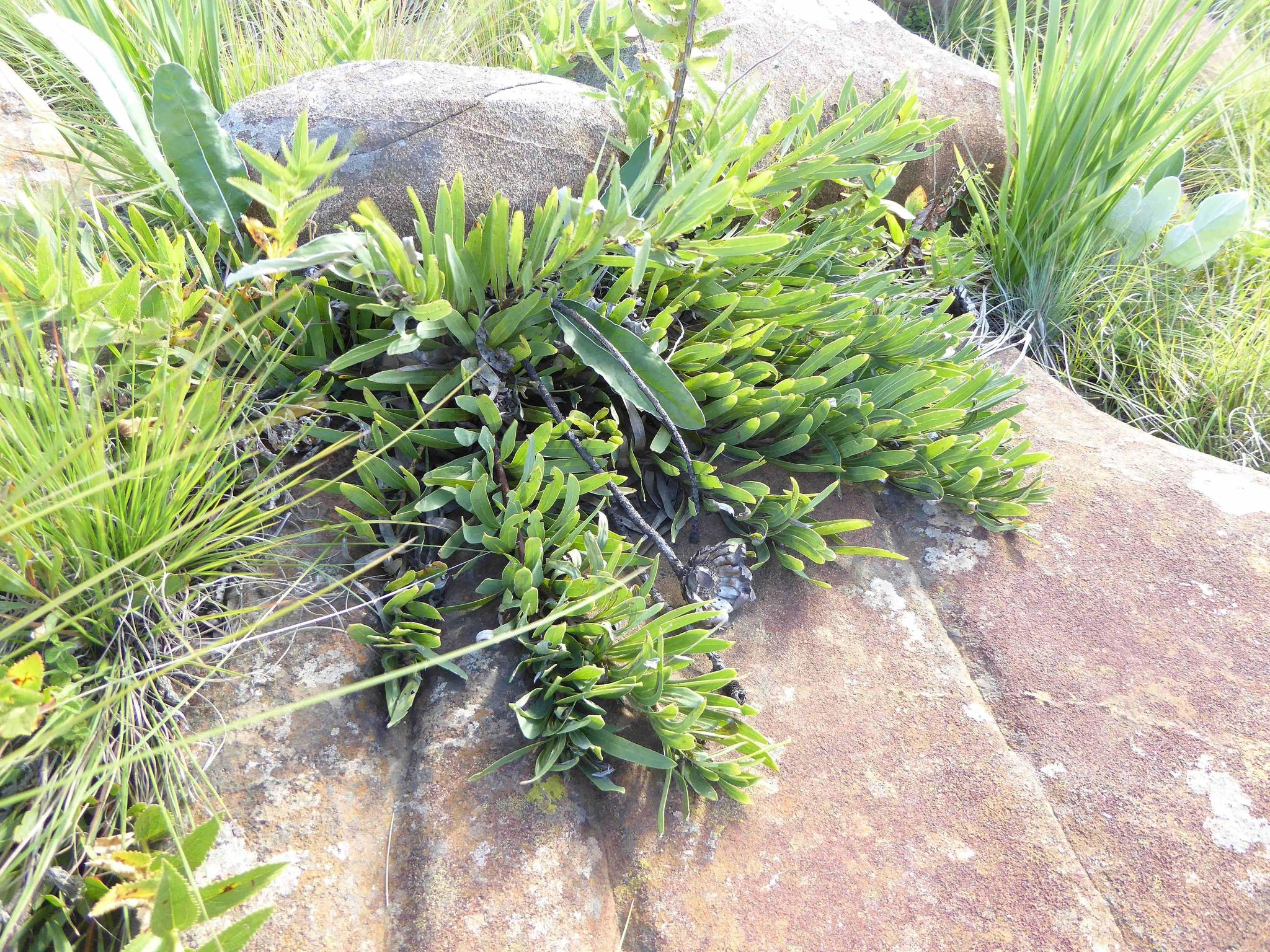

Conservation status
- Near Threatened (IUCN 3.1)

Scientific classification
- Kingdom: Plantae
- Clade: Tracheophytes
- Clade: Angiosperms
- Clade: Eudicots
- Order: Proteales
- Family: Proteaceae
- Genus: Protea
- Species: P. parvula

Binomial name
- Protea parvula Beard

= Protea parvula =

Species of flowering shrub

Protea parvula, also known as the dainty sugarbush, or kleinsuikerbos in Afrikaans, is a small flowering shrub belonging to the genus Protea.

== Taxonomy ==
It was first described in 1958 from Mpumalanga (then part of the former Transvaal province) by John Stanley Beard.

== Description ==
It is a low-growing, creeping, shrubby groundcover, growing only up to 16cm in height.

Sources differ on the ability of this species to survive wildfires. According to one source it is long-lived, with plants surviving over a century, and can regrow after fire from an underground bole or rootstock, another source states the plant is killed by fire. The seeds are released by the plant as soon as the woody fruit is ripe, from April to July, and are dispersed by the wind. The seeds are fire-proof, and simply lie on the ground until germination.

Protea parvula flowers in the summer, from December to March. The plant is monoecious with both sexes in each flower. The flowers are pollinated by birds.

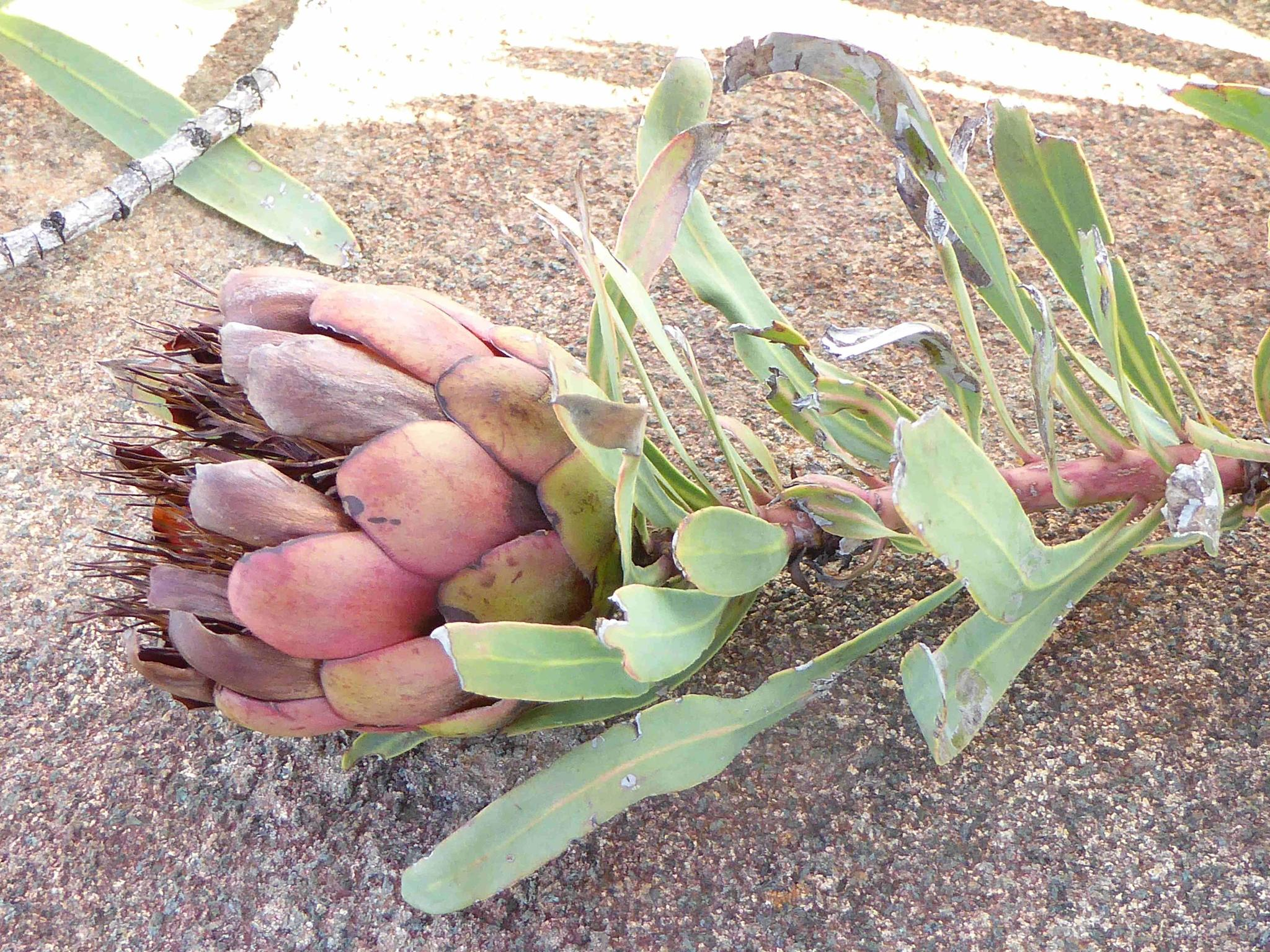
Inflorescence

== Distribution ==
Protea parvula is found on the slopes of the Drakensberg Mountains, from Mariepskop, through Mpumalanga and eSwatini, to Vryheid in central northern KwaZulu-Natal. It grows in rocky, exposed grassland on acid soils, at elevations of 1,300 to 2,150 meters.

== Conservation ==
In 1996 it was assessed as "not threatened" in the Red data list of southern African plants, but in 2009 it was re-assessed as "near threatened", due to an estimated population reduction of 20-30%, caused by a loss of 28% of its natural habitat over the past century. It is primarily threatened by the planting of forests of non-native pine trees (afforestation) as well as mining for soapstone. It may, however, be locally common.

The species is protected in the Malolotja Nature Reserve in eSwatini.
