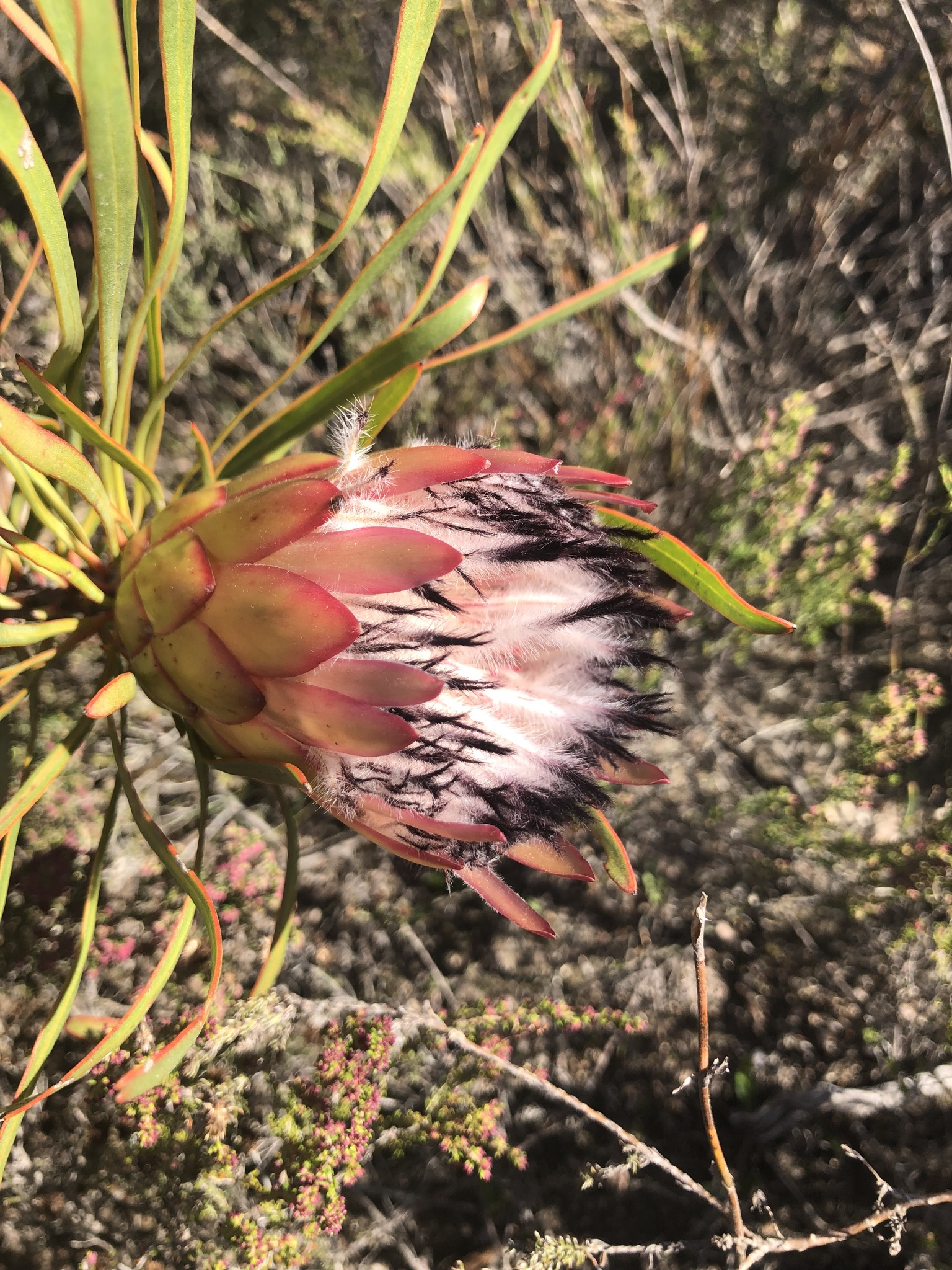

Conservation status
- Endangered (IUCN 3.1)

Scientific classification
- Kingdom: Plantae
- Clade: Embryophytes
- Clade: Tracheophytes
- Clade: Angiosperms
- Clade: Eudicots
- Order: Proteales
- Family: Proteaceae
- Genus: Protea
- Species: P. pudens

Binomial name
- Protea pudens Rourke

Synonyms
- Protea minor sensu Compton (in part), excluding type

= Protea pudens =

Species of flowering plant

Protea pudens, also known as the bashful sugarbush, is a low-growing, groundcover-like, flowering shrub in the genus Protea. It is only found growing in the wild in a small area in the Western Cape province of South Africa.

In Afrikaans this species is known by the vernacular name of aardroos suikerbos.

== Taxonomy ==
Protea pudens was first described as a new species by the South African botanist John Patrick Rourke in 1979, who had collected it in the field from 1973.

== Description ==
The plant grows as a prostrate shrub flat along the ground, forming a mat up to 1 metre (3 ft 3 in) in diameter, 30 centimetres (12 in) in height. It is sparsely branching; the stems are 1 centimetre (0.39 in) in diameter. It blooms with the inflorescences usually at ground level. It blooms in the winter, from May to September, with the peak from July to August. The plant is monoecious with both sexes in each flower. The flowers have no scent. The bracts subtending the inflorescence are deep pink in colour.

== Distribution ==
The plant is endemic to the southwestern Cape Region in South Africa, and occurs in a small area on flats near the village of Elim, and elsewhere on the Agulhas Plain, in the Western Cape province. The extent of occurrence only consists of 67 km^{2} (26 sq mi), wherein it is only known to occur at four localities.

== Ecology ==
The plant grows in heavy, sandy clay, or shale-derived, gravelly soils, at altitudes of 23, to 30–40 metres (100–130 ft). It grows in a specific type of ferricrete-soil, fynbos habitat.

Pollination occurs through the action of birds.

Possible wildfires will destroy the mature plants, only the seeds will survive such an event. The seeds are stored in the many caps (fruits) in the dried, fire-resistant seed head, which is itself retained on the plant after senescence. The fruits are woody and persistent. The seeds are released from the caps after wildfires and dispersed by means of the wind.

== Conservation ==
It is rare, although when collected in 1973, up to 1998, it was locally common within the small area where it is known to occur. It is a cryptic plant and easily overlooked.

It was first added to the Red data list of southern African plants as 'endangered' by the South African National Biodiversity Institute (SANBI) in 1996, and this was upheld in 2006 and 2009. According to the 2006 SANBI assessment, the overall population is decreasing. Major threats to its survival were considered to be habitat loss due to expanding agriculture and invasive plants, as well as wild flower harvesting. Its total population is furthermore prone to fluctuations in abundance due to wildfires.
