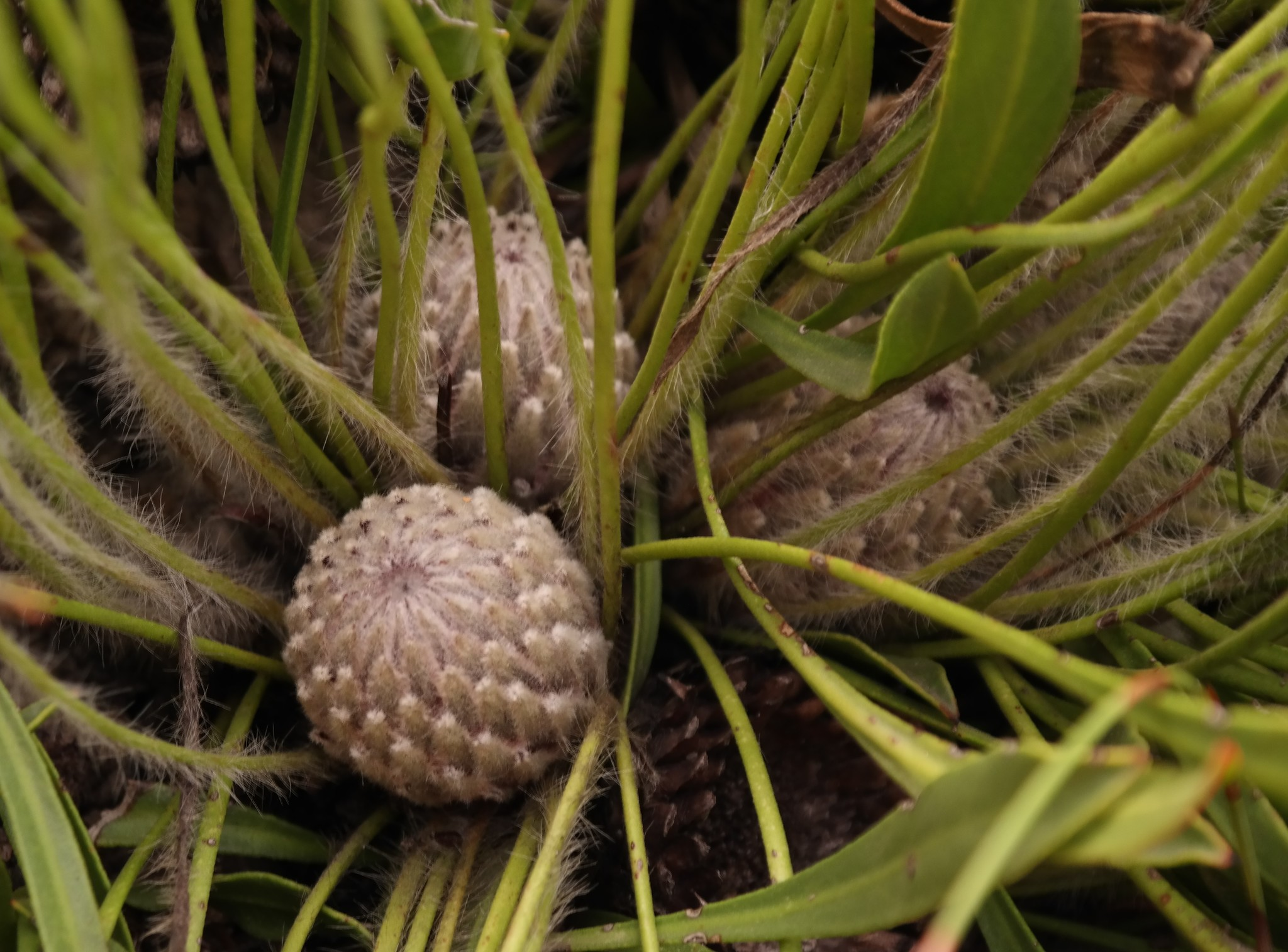

Conservation status
- Least Concern (IUCN 3.1)

Scientific classification
- Kingdom: Plantae
- Clade: Embryophytes
- Clade: Tracheophytes
- Clade: Angiosperms
- Clade: Eudicots
- Order: Proteales
- Family: Proteaceae
- Genus: Protea
- Species: P. scabriuscula

Binomial name
- Protea scabriuscula E.Phillips

= Protea scabriuscula =

Species of flowering plant

Protea scabriuscula, also known as the hoary sugarbush or gray sugarbush, is a flowering shrub, endemic to the southwestern Cape Region of South Africa.

The species was first described by Edwin Percy Phillips in 1910.

This plant grows in the form of a bush, which can reach up to 50 cm (20 in) tall. Its leaves are narrow, and range in size from 0.5 to 2 cm wide. The small flowerhead only grows up to 6 cm across. The plants' dense stems form a round, cushion-like clump.

Protea scabriuscula is endemic to the Western Cape province of South Africa. Its range is limited to a few localised areas in this province. Specifically, the plant has been observed only on the high Matroosberg in the Hex River Mountains and on the peaks of the Koue Bokkeveld Mountains.

It prefers a fynbos habitat. It is usually found on sandstone-derived soils, although sometimes on those based on quartzite.

The population was believed to be stable by the South African National Biodiversity Institute in 2019. This institute has assessed the conservation status as 'least concern' first in 2009, later again in 2019.
