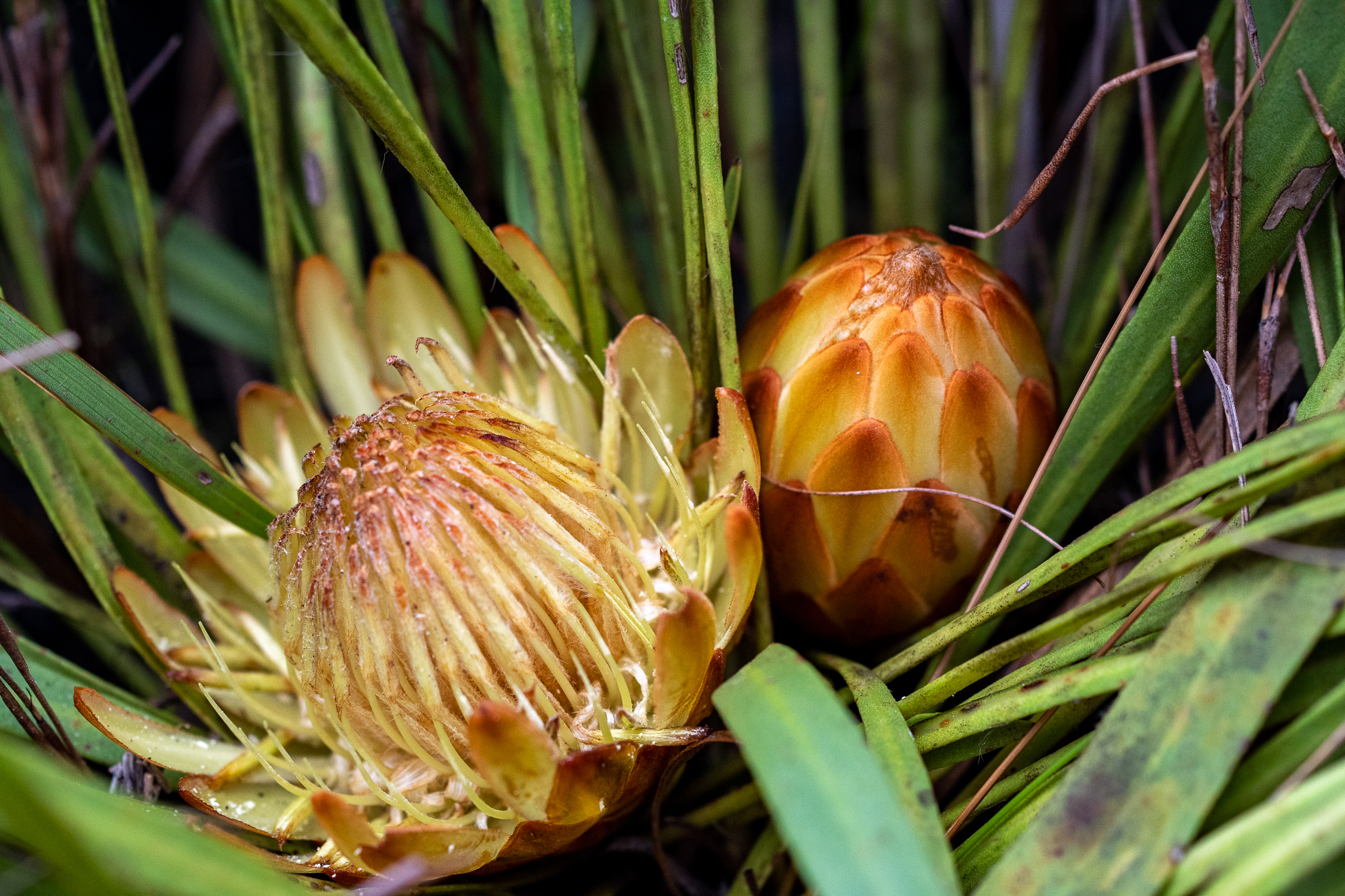

Conservation status
- Vulnerable (IUCN 3.1)

Scientific classification
- Kingdom: Plantae
- Clade: Tracheophytes
- Clade: Angiosperms
- Clade: Eudicots
- Order: Proteales
- Family: Proteaceae
- Genus: Protea
- Species: P. scabra

Binomial name
- Protea scabra R.Br.

Synonyms
- Protea tenuifolia R.Br.

= Protea scabra =

Species of flowering shrub

Protea scabra, also known as the sandpaper-leaf sugarbush, is a flowering groundcover that belongs to the genus Protea. The plant is endemic to South Africa and is found from the Hottentots Holland Mountains across the Riviersonderend Mountains, the Kleinrivier Mountains and around the town of Caledon to the Swartberg mountains.

Other vernacular names which have been recorded for this species are rasp-leaf erodendrum, scab-leaf protea, and scabrous sugarbush. In Afrikaans it is known as the skurweblaargrondsuikerbos.

== Taxonomy ==
This species was collected as a herbarium specimen by William Roxburgh during a stop at the Cape of Good Hope on the way to India, and was first described by Robert Brown in the 1810 publication On the Proteaceae of Jussieu. Brown states the wealthy merchant George Hibbert grew the species in his private protea collection, although he questions if it were not another new species entirely. Brown also described Protea tenuifolia from a plant obtained by Hibbert's personal plant collector, the Scotsman James Niven, in the same publication. Although this taxon is now seen as a synonym of this species and was published first and thus had priority, the name had already been published a number of times prior for other species and was therefore occupied and illegitimate.

== Description ==
The shrub forms a dense mat, up to 50cm in diameter, of root-like, underground rhizomes. Tufts of leaves eventually bearing flowers appear on the surface of the soil. It is long-lived, with individuals living longer than a century. The plant sprouts again from the underground stems after fires.

== Ecology ==
The plant is monoecious with both sexes in each flower. It blooms from April to October with the peak from July to October. Pollination may occur through the action of rodents, although it might also be pollinated by birds. The seeds are stored in the woody fruit which is retained on the plant for one to two years, until fires open the fruit. When released the seeds are dispersed by wind.

The species grows on flats or low slopes in mountainous areas, typically in shale soil, but also in sandstone fynbos, at elevations of 50 - 900 m.

== Conservation ==
The population of this species has decreased by an estimated 25-30% over the last century due to afforestation, invasive species, agriculture and urban expansion, but it is still locally common.
