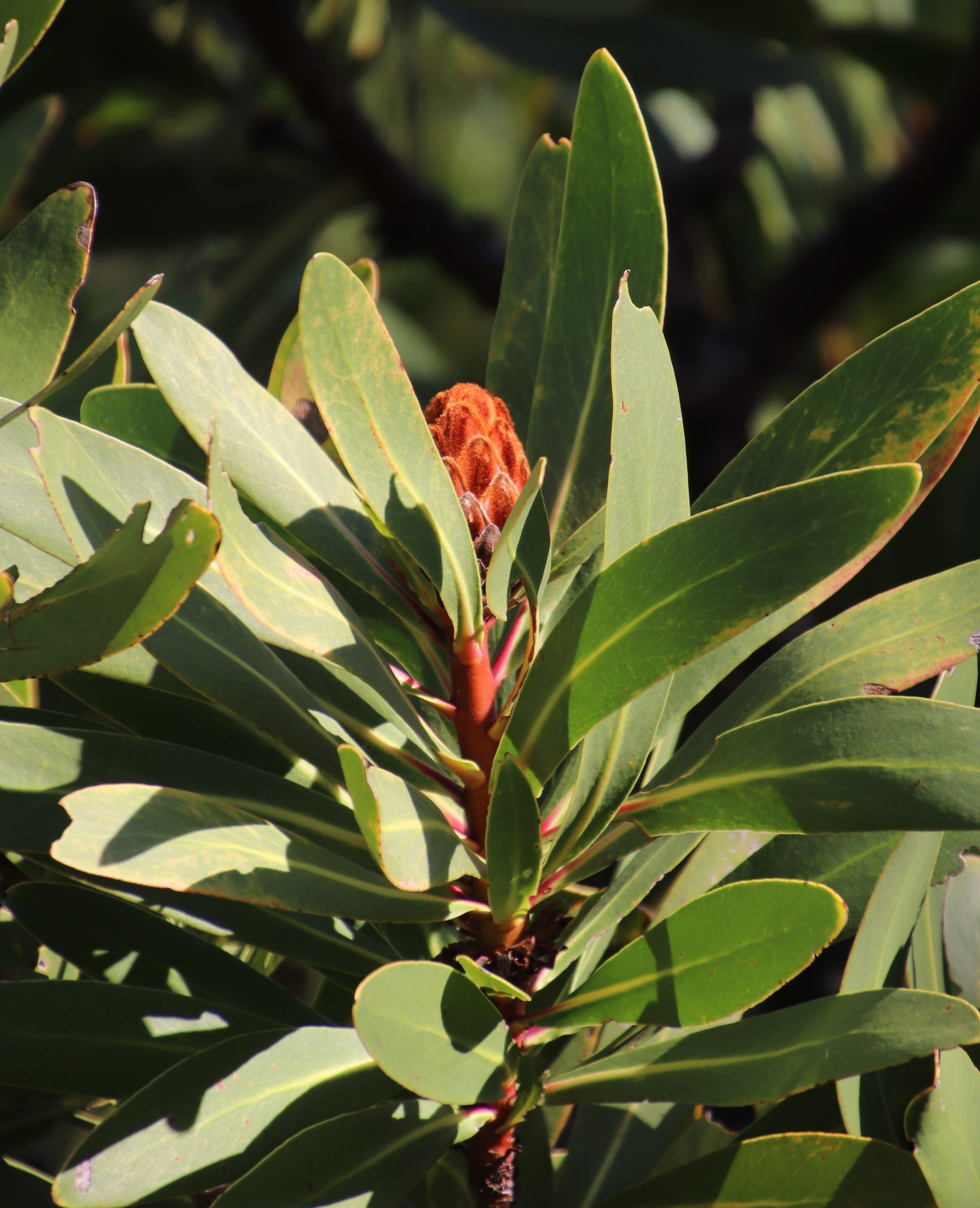
- The red-haired developing inflorescence of Protea rubropilosa

Conservation status
- Least Concern (IUCN 3.1)

Scientific classification
- Kingdom: Plantae
- Clade: Tracheophytes
- Clade: Angiosperms
- Clade: Eudicots
- Order: Proteales
- Family: Proteaceae
- Genus: Protea
- Species: P. rubropilosa

Binomial name
- Protea rubropilosa Beard

= Protea rubropilosa =

Flowering tree

Protea rubropilosa, also known as the Transvaal sugarbush, escarpment sugarbush or Transvaal mountain sugarbush, is a flowering tree, that belongs to the genus Protea in the family Proteaceae. The plant only occurs in South Africa.

Other vernacular names which have been recorded for this tree are platorand-suikerbos and Transvaalse berg-suikerbos in the Afrikaans language, and segwapi in Northern Sotho.

== Taxonomy ==
Protea rubropilosa was described as new to science by the British forester John Stanley Beard in 1958. It had been discovered just earlier that same year by one S. Thompson on the Wolkberg. An isotype is kept at the herbarium at Kew.

== Description ==
The tree becomes 8 m (26 ft) high and is brushy, spreading out its canopy. The trunk is twisted and the bark gnarled. It blooms in spring, from September to December, with the peak in October. The outside of the bracts are very hairy and coloured reddish-brown. The inside of the bracts are bright red. The florets turn from whitish to bright red. The plant is monoecious, both sexes occur in each flower.

== Distribution ==
Protea rubropilosa is endemic to a section of the slopes of the Great Escarpment in northeastern South Africa, where it occurs in the provinces of Mpumalanga and Limpopo. It is distributed from the Wolkberg to Lydenburg. It occurs along the Blyderivier.

== Ecology ==
Pollination occurs through the action of birds. The seed is released nine to twelve months after flowering. The seed is dispersed by means of the wind. The seeds simply lie on the ground until they are able to germinate, as opposed to being stored in the infructescence. The wildfires which periodically move through the land in which the tree grows destroy the adult plants, but the seeds can survive such an event. The plant grows on south-facing slopes, in sandstone and quartzite-derived soils, at altitudes of 1,400 to 2,300 metres. It occurs in habitats of montane grassland around the Long Tom Pass, sourveld on mountain summits and cliff-slopes, and the fynbos which can occur in afromontane areas of the Northern Escarpment.

== Uses ==
This plant is grown at the Kirstenbosch National Botanical Garden. The tree's national number is 97.

== Conservation ==
It is uncommon, but the species is not threatened and it is locally abundant. As of 2019 the total population numbers are believed to be stable. It was first officially assessed as 'rare' in 1980, but in 1996, when the South African National Botanical Institute (SANBI) first assessed this species for the Red data list of southern African plants, the conservation status was changed to 'not threatened'. In 2009 SANBI re-assessed Protea rubropilosa as 'least concern', an assessment which was reiterated in 2019.
