= Protea petiolaris =

Conservation status
- Least Concern (IUCN 3.1)

Scientific classification
- Kingdom: Plantae
- Clade: Tracheophytes
- Clade: Angiosperms
- Clade: Eudicots
- Order: Proteales
- Family: Proteaceae
- Genus: Protea
- Species: P. petiolaris

Binomial name
- Protea petiolaris (Hiern) Baker & C.H.Wright

Synonyms
- Leucadendron petiolare Hiern

Tree native to east Africa

Protea petiolaris, also known as the sickle-leaf sugarbush, is a tree in the family Proteaceae. It is found in Angola, Democratic Republic of the Congo, Zambia and Zimbabwe.

== Description ==
It grows up to 8 metres (26 ft) in height. Its perfect monoecious flowers open from November through March, and set mature fruit nine to twelve months after flowering. Flowers are pollinated by birds, and the seeds are dispersed by wind.

== Habitat ==
It prefers woods and grasslands at high altitudes.
