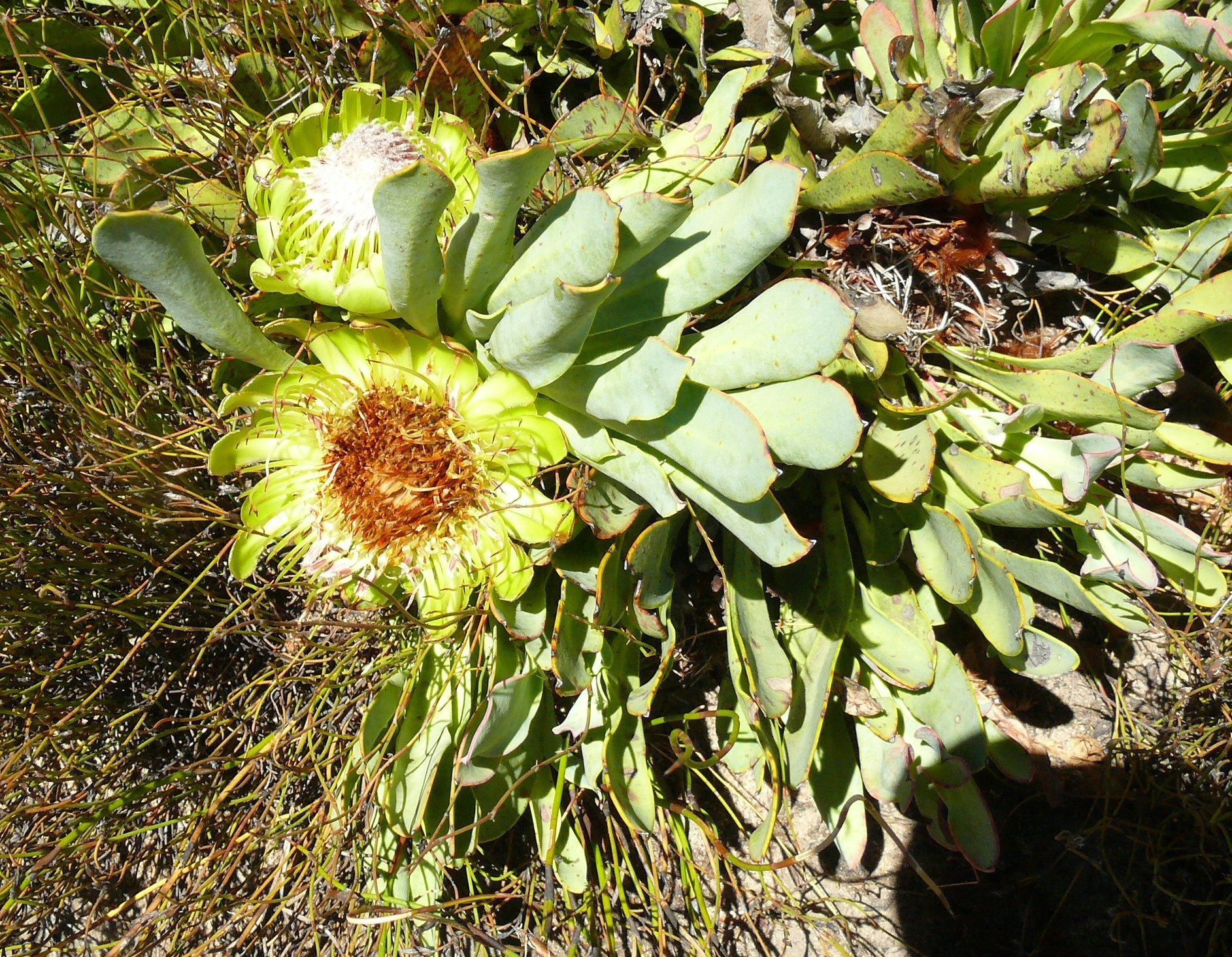

Conservation status
- Least Concern (IUCN 3.1)

Scientific classification
- Kingdom: Plantae
- Clade: Tracheophytes
- Clade: Angiosperms
- Clade: Eudicots
- Order: Proteales
- Family: Proteaceae
- Genus: Protea
- Species: P. laevis

Binomial name
- Protea laevis R.Br.

Synonyms
- Scolymocephalus laevis (R.Br.) Kuntze; Protea elongata R.Br.; Scolymocephalus elongatus (R.Br.) Kuntze; Protea zeyheri E.Phillips

= Protea laevis =

Species of shrub

Protea laevis, also known as the smooth-leaf sugarbush, is a flowering shrub that belongs within the genus Protea.

In the Afrikaans language it is known by the vernacular names of gladdeblaardwergprotea or gladde-blaarsuikerbos.

== Taxonomy ==
Protea laevis was first described by Robert Brown in his 1810 treatise On the Proteaceae of Jussieu.

== Description ==
The plant takes the form of a prostrate shrub. The main stem is subterranean. It grows up to 80 centimetres (31 in) in diameter. The above-ground branches are up to over 3 inches (7.6 cm) long, glabrous, prostrate, sometimes ascending.

It has forms with narrow leaves, as well as forms possessing much broader leaves.

It blooms in late Spring, from September to February, with the peak from September to November. The plant is monoecious with both sexes in each flower. The seed is stored in a capsule within the woody, dried inflorescence, which is itself retained on the shrub after it is dead ('persistent'). The seeds are usually released one to two years after flowering and dispersed through by means of the wind.

== Distribution ==
This plant is endemic to the Western Cape province of South Africa. It occurs from the Cederberg to the Hex River Mountains and Waboomsberg (which is one of the Koue Bokkeveld Mountains). It occurs below the Langeberg in the Cederberg Mountains and on Hansiesberg in the Skurweberg Range of the Koue Bokkeveld Mountains.

== Ecology ==
Pollination occurs through the action of rats, mice and birds. The plant grows in dry, rocky, mountain ledges at altitudes of 1000 to 1800 metres. Potential wildfires destroy the adult plants, but the seeds are able to survive such events.

== Conservation ==
It is rare, and usually found as solitary individuals or in isolated, small groups of less than two dozen plants. The population numbers are thought to be stable.
