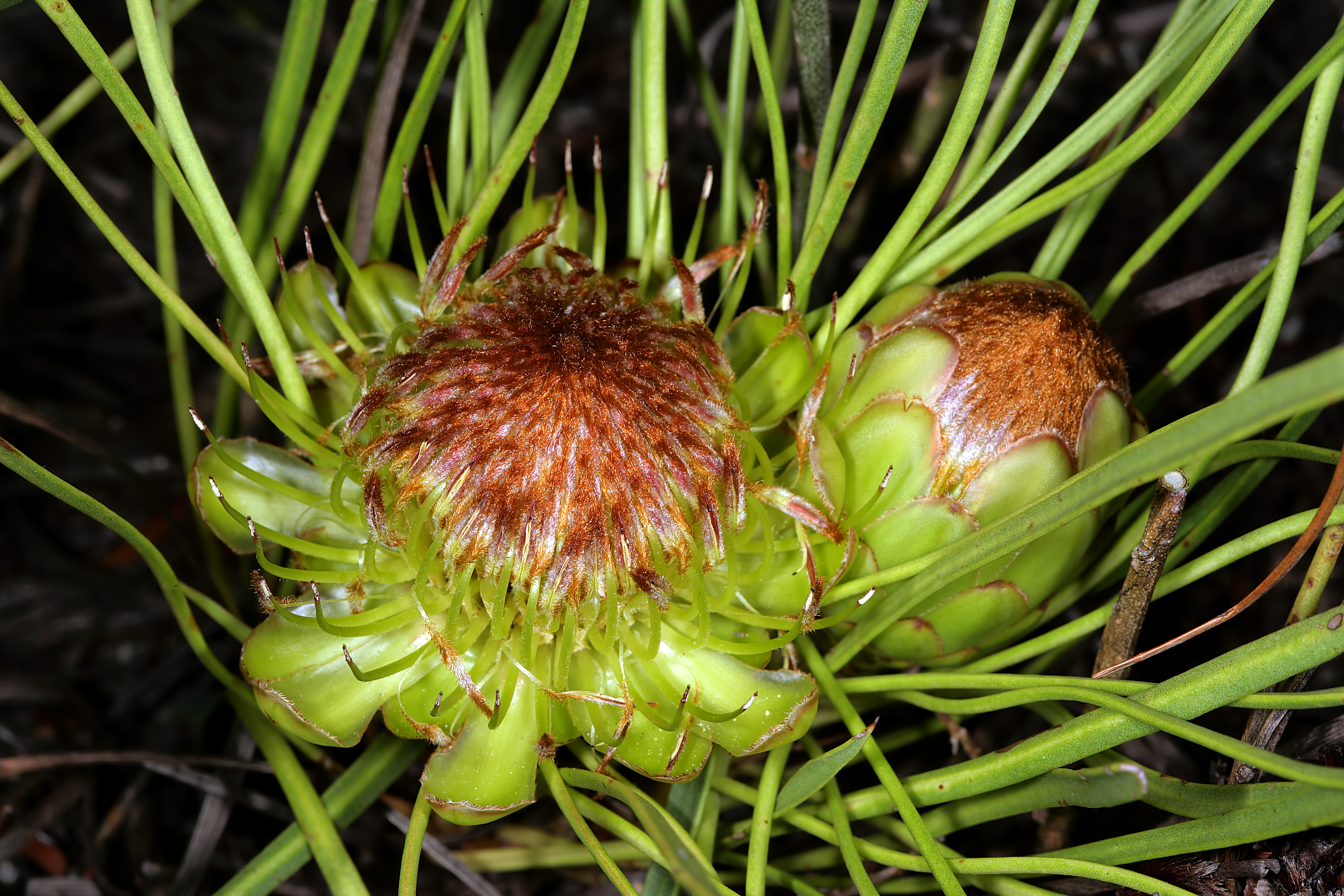
- Protea angustata in South Africa

Conservation status
- Vulnerable (IUCN 3.1)

Scientific classification
- Kingdom: Plantae
- Clade: Embryophytes
- Clade: Tracheophytes
- Clade: Angiosperms
- Clade: Eudicots
- Order: Proteales
- Family: Proteaceae
- Genus: Protea
- Species: P. angustata

Binomial name
- Protea angustata R.Br.

Synonyms
- Scolymocephalus angustatus (R.Br.) Kuntze

= Protea angustata =

Species of flowering plant

Protea angustata, also known as the Kleinmond sugarbush, is a flowering shrub that belongs to the genus Protea. This plant is endemic to the south-west Cape Region of South Africa.

== Taxonomy ==
Protea angustata was first discovered in 1801, growing in the mountains near Houwhoek Pass, by the Scotsman James Niven. It was first described by Robert Brown in his 1810 treatise On the Proteaceae of Jussieu.

Otto Kuntze moved it to Scolymocephalus angustatus in 1891, but by 1912 it was being referred to as a Protea again.

The specific epithet is derived from the Latin word for 'narrowed', in reference to its leaves.

== Description ==
This dwarf shrublet is small and only grows up to 35 cm (14 in) in height. It can eventually forms an extensive subterranean mat of up to 1.5 metres (4 ft 11 in) across, above which sparsely distributed tufts of leaves poke above the soil. The plants are very cryptic and hard to spot, not only being rare, but also concealed in form among similar-looking restios. Much of the plant remains below the ground, and it is thus well protected from the wildfires that burn through its habitat from time to time. There is a thick, woody rootstock, from which numerous underground stems branch out. Perhaps because it has the ability to re-sprout after wildfires, old shrubs remain growing in isolated remnant habitat with high persistence. This species is believed become very old, having a generation length of more than a century. In cultivation, the shrubs only begin to bloom after their seventh year.

The leaves are very long and narrow, and blend in with the other reed-like ground plants of its habitat. They are smooth and hairless (glabrous), curve upwards, and measure some 12 to 25 cm (4.7 to 9.8 in) in length, and 2–8 mm in width. The leaves are usually flat, but may also sometimes have an in-rolled margin. The tip is pointed and the base, where the leaf attaches to the stem, tapers slowly in width to the broadest part of the leaf.

It blooms from July to October, with the peak being in early September. It only produces a few, small, greenish-cream flower heads close to the ground level. These flower heads are positioned laterally on the stems (not at the tips, so with leaves growing above them), are cup-shaped, only 3 to 4.5 cm in width, this including the 22–28 mm long bracts of a "creamy green to apple-green" colour, which surround the actual flowers. The upper margin of the bracts are tipped with velvety brown hairs. The flowers are narrow and tubular. The plant is monoecious with both sexes in each flower. Blooming plants have a strong yeasty smell. Even in cultivation, the plants do not flower every year, and on most years only two or three flower heads are produced by a plant.

The seed is stored in a capsule which is held within the woody, dried, fire-resistant inflorescence, which is itself retained on the plant after senescence ('persistent'). The seeds are released one to two years after flowering, after wildfires cause the fruits to open. Seeds are dispersed through means of the wind.

== Distribution ==
Protea angustata is endemic to the Western Cape province of South Africa. It has a limited distribution, occurring along a narrow band which mirrors the coastline in the southwestern Cape Region, usually not further inland than 5 km (3.1 mi) from the sea. The largest population is in the neighbourhood of Brightwater, in Cape Town, with perhaps 50% of the total population being found here. The three largest populations are found in Pringle Bay, Onrusrivier and Kleinmond, all areas in the vicinity of Cape Town which are experiencing rapid urban development. There are only a few plants east of the town of Hermanus, but the majority of the world population is found in the lands westwards from there until Pringle Bay. It is also found from the Kogelberg mountains, across to the Groenland mountains and Kleinrivier mountains. Somewhat isolated populations occur on the Caledon Swartberg. The spatial distribution of the species is spread out, with individual plants usually not found near each other.

== Ecology ==
It is found in the southern foothills of the coastal mountains. The plant grows on flats and on gentle slopes facing the sea, in sand and in clay soils, It usually grows in a fynbos habitat in deep, white, sandy soils, but the plants growing at the Kleinmond locality are found growing in a coastal brush in shale-derived soils. It grows in a region with a temperate climate, in which the rainfall primarily occurs during winter. at altitudes from sea level to 180 metres (590 ft).

Pollination likely occurs through the action of mice, rats, birds and/or insects. According to one source, mice are the most likely pollinators, based on the fact that the flowers have a typical smell, are low to the ground, and do not have showy colours which attract birds or insects.

According to one source, periodic wildfires will destroy the adult plants, but the seeds can survive such an occurrence. Another two references clarify that it is a long-lived species and only the above-ground organs are destroyed. It survives fires by re-sprouting from its thick rootstock and underground stems, and in fact fire even seems to stimulate new growth. Flowers usually appear three years after a fire has passed over a territory. Without fire, plants can become weak and have a diminished capacity to flower and set seed, a situation easily reversed after fire.

== Horticulture ==
It is not a showy species. Propagation by means of cuttings has not yet been achieved, so in order to grow new plants one must sow the seed. It is not easy to grow. The flower heads are inadequate for use as a cut flower, being infrequent and having a short stalk. It was first introduced into cultivation around 1930 at the Kirstenbosch Botanical Gardens.

Seeds need a smoke treatment to help them germinate, and a fungicide treatment while still seeds helps keep the seedlings alive. They require a light, well-drained substrate. In South Africa the best sowing time is in the autumn. Seedlings need sun, good air circulation, and prefer temperatures of 1 to 11 °C (34 to 52 °F). Germination occurs after about six weeks. It requires regular watering in its first two years of growth.

It prefers a sunny open situation in the garden and to not be disturbed after planting out. Good drainage is required and too much water can kill the plants. Pruning the old flower heads and the stems supporting them down to the ground, will encourage the rhizomes below to send up new growth of flower-bearing branches.

== Conservation ==
This is a species which has been rare for a long time. It was first assessed as 'vulnerable' in 1980. It was again assessed as 'vulnerable' in 1996, this time by the South African National Biodiversity Institute (SANBI), but it now is considered 'endangered', having first being assessed as such in 2005, and again in 2009, in the Red List of South African Plants maintained by SANBI.

It is mainly being threatened by habitat loss due to urban expansion. Other threats constitute invasive plant species, as well as other Protea species. These plants are being grown in orchards in its former habitat for the cut flower industry. The entire wild population is only about 2,000 plants in total. The population trend is said to be decreasing, nonetheless SANBI stated the numbers were "not declining" in 2005. At the same time they state that further development is likely cause at least a 20% decline in population by the year 2045.
