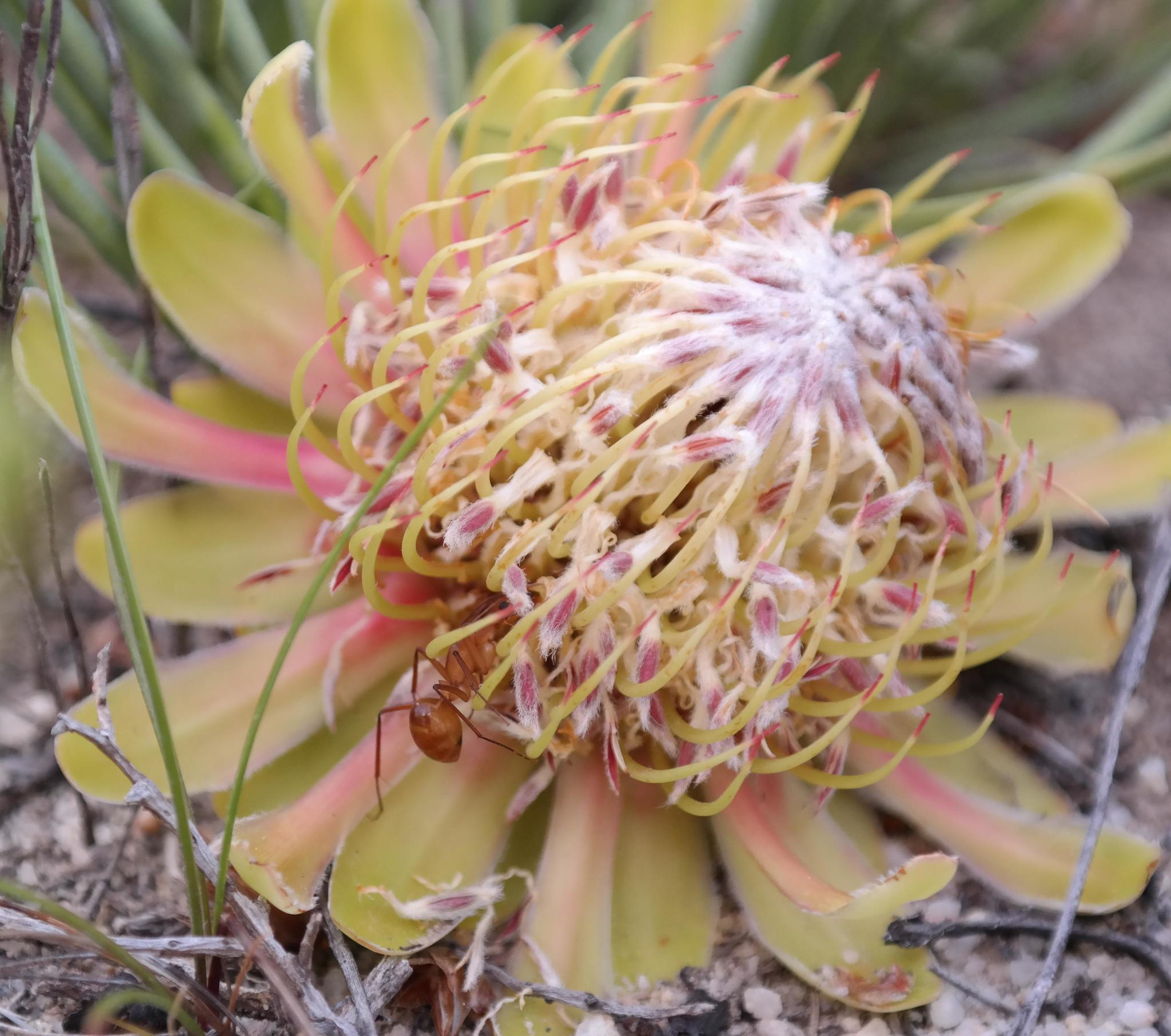

Conservation status
- Least Concern (IUCN 3.1)

Scientific classification
- Kingdom: Plantae
- Clade: Tracheophytes
- Clade: Angiosperms
- Clade: Eudicots
- Order: Proteales
- Family: Proteaceae
- Genus: Protea
- Species: P. revoluta

Binomial name
- Protea revoluta R.Br.

Synonyms
- Scolymocephalus neriifolius (R.Br.) Kuntze

= Protea revoluta =

Species of flowering plant

Protea revoluta, also known as the roll-leaved sugarbush or rolled-leaf sugarbush, is a species of plant which is classified in the genus Protea. P. revoluta is only found growing in the wild in South Africa, where plants can be found growing between the Cederberg inland on the Atlantic coast and the Witteberg area to the north.

In Afrikaans this species is known by the vernacular name of gerolde-blaarsuikerbos.

This species was first described according to the modern Linnaean system by the naturalist Robert Brown in his 1810 treatise On the Proteaceae of Jussieu.

The plant is a prostrate groundcover and grows flat up to two metres in diameter. The blooming season lasts from November to January.

The seeds are stored on the plant in the dry inflorescence. They are usually released one to two years after flowering, and are dispersed to new growing locations by action of the wind. The plant is monoecious with both sexes in each flower. Pollination in this species is achieved by means of rats, mice and birds.

It is endemic to the Western Cape province of southwestern South Africa.

The plant grows in mountainous renosterveld, at altitudes between 900 and 1,600 metres. Frequent wildfires in this habitat kill adult plants of P. revoluta, but the seeds can survive such events.
