= Riviersonderend Mountains =

Mountain range in Western Cape, South Africa

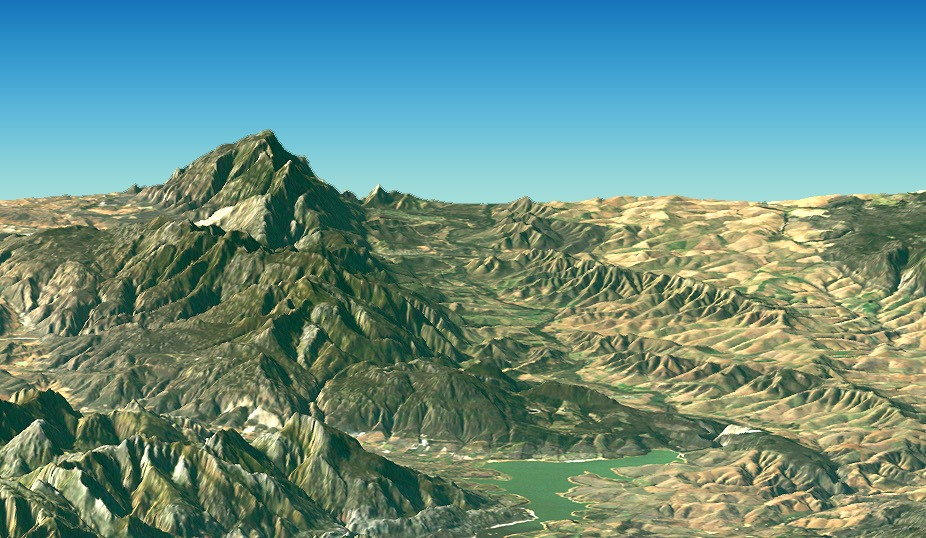
- Satellite image of the western section of the range, looking east

Highest point
- Peak: Pilaarkop
- Elevation: 1,654 m (5,427 ft)
- Listing: List of mountain ranges of South Africa
- Coordinates: 33°59′52″S 19°35′40″E

Dimensions
- Length: 71 km (44 mi) W/E
- Width: 33 km (21 mi) N/S

Geography
- Location within South Africa
- Country: South Africa
- Province: Western Cape
- Parent range: Western Cape System

Geology
- Orogeny: Cape Fold Belt
- Rock age: Paleoproterozoic
- Rock type: Sandstone

Climbing
- Easiest route: From Greyton

The Riviersonderend Mountains are a mountain range in the Cape Fold Belt of the Western Cape province of South Africa. They run east to west from Riviersonderend to Villiersdorp, separating the Breede River Valley from the Overberg region. They are composed of Table Mountain Sandstone and attain a maximum height near McGregor and Riviersonderend as Pilaarkop (Afrikaans: Pillar Head (1654m)). The ranges are rich in fynbos flora and experience a typical Mediterranean climate.

The name stems from the Sonderend River, and was originally a literal translation of the Khoi-khoi name "Kannakamkanna" ("river without end") into Afrikaans.

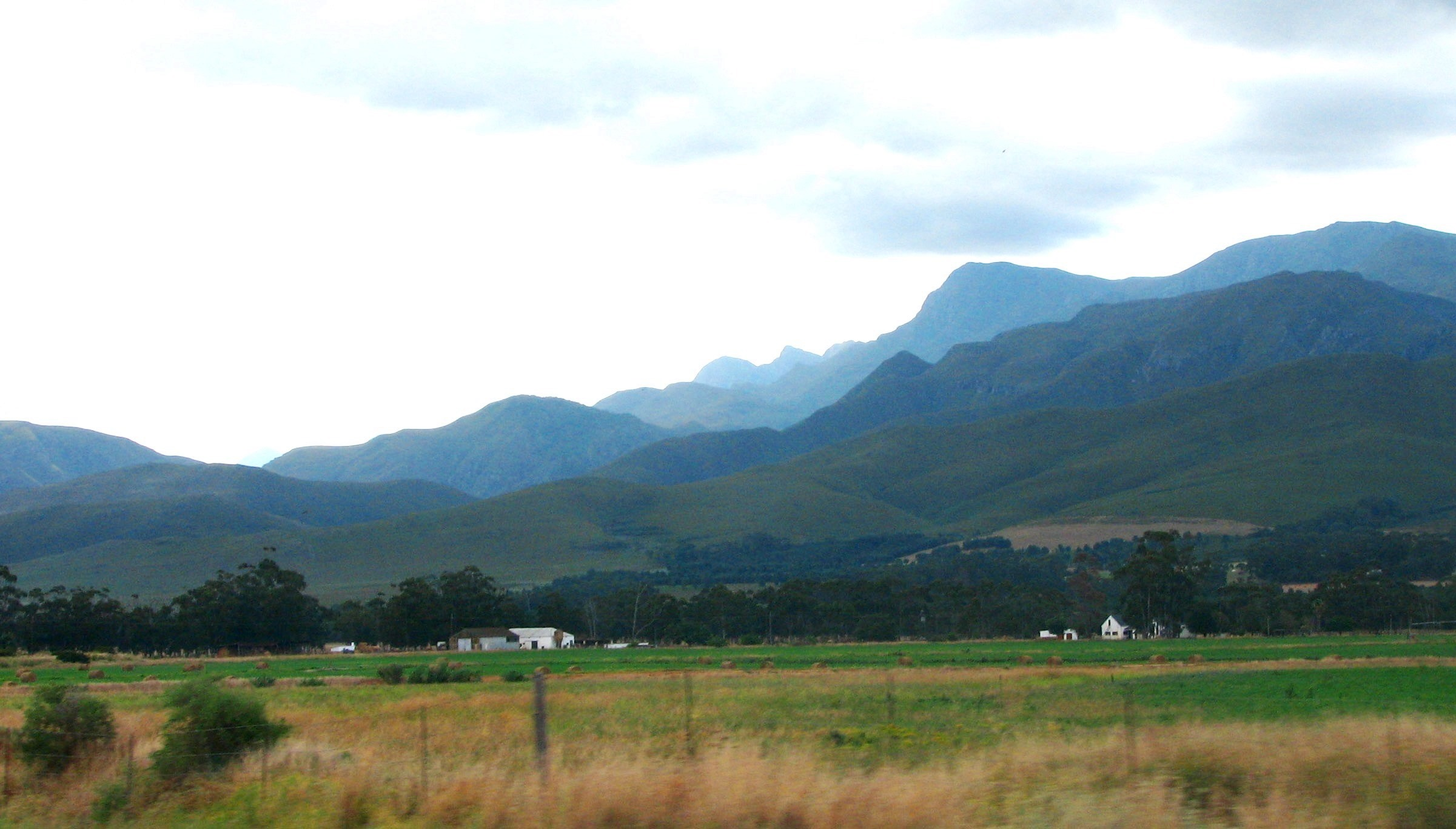
Riviersonderend Mountains from the N2 highway near the town of Riviersonderend
