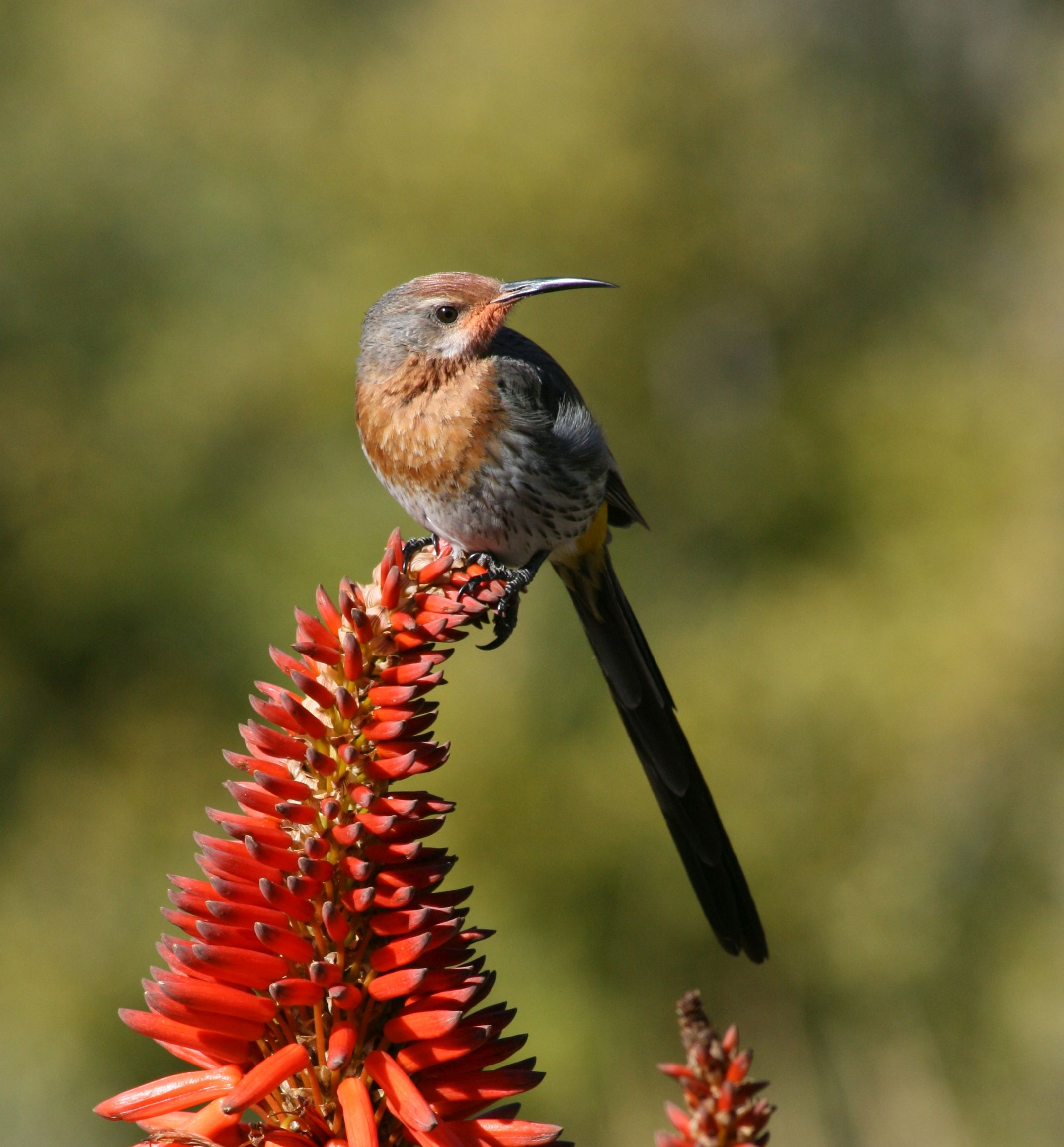
- At Cavern Resort, KwaZulu-Natal Drakensberg, South Africa.

Conservation status
- Near Threatened (IUCN 3.1)

Scientific classification
- Kingdom: Animalia
- Phylum: Chordata
- Class: Aves
- Order: Passeriformes
- Family: Promeropidae
- Genus: Promerops
- Species: P. gurneyi

Binomial name
- Promerops gurneyi Verreaux, 1871

= Gurney's sugarbird =

Species of bird

Gurney's sugarbird (Promerops gurneyi) is a medium-sized passerine endemic to the mid- and high-altitude grassland velds in southern Africa. It belongs to the family Promeropidae, which contains one genus, Promerops, and two species. Gurney's sugarbird feeds on nectar from Protea bushes as well as on small insects. This bird is characterized by its long, graduated tail and decurved beak.

The common name and Latin binomial commemorate the British banker and amateur ornithologist John Henry Gurney (1819-1890).

== Description ==
Gurney's sugarbird has a long, decurved bill characteristic of nectarivores. It has a chestnut-coloured forehead, along with a faint white eyestripe and white mustachial stripe. A white throat stands out against the russet breast. This species of sugarbird has a dark grey back, and a conspicuous bright yellow rump makes this bird easy to spot. The tail is long and graduated, ranging from 11 to 19.3 cm in length. This species measures between 23 and 29 cm in total, and body mass ranges from 30 to 46.5 g in males and 23 to 43 g in females. Females are smaller than males, with shorter bills and tail feathers. Males also have triangular-shaped bulge on the sixth primary feather, used in mating displays. Immature individuals are duller than adults and have a greenish tinge to both their breast and yellow rump. Further, their secondary feathers are edged with a brownish colour.

The two subspecies of Gurney's surgarbird have minor differences in their appearance. P. g. gurneyi individuals fit the above description. Meanwhile, P. g. ardens individuals tend to be darker, with a greener rump and a richer chestnut breast than their counterpart subspecies.

Gurney's sugarbirds moult their flight feathers (primary and secondary feathers) during the breeding season. Tail feathers, however, moult throughout the year continuously. This is because the long feathers are easily damaged and must be replaced quickly due to their important role in mating displays.

== Taxonomy ==
Promerops gurneyi is one of two species within the genus Promerops and the monotypic family Promeropidae. Gurney's sugarbird has a single sister species, the Cape sugarbird (Promerops cafer).

Its taxonomic ranking baffled scientists for many years. This family has been grouped in with the Nectariniidae (sunbird) family, due to their physical resemblances and shared geographic origins, as both sunbirds and sugarbirds evolved in Africa. Promeropidae was also once classified in the Australian Meliphagidae (honeyeaters) family, because of their shared and unique tongue structure, behaviour, and nest-building. There was no evidence of common lineage, however, and similarities appear to be from convergent evolution. Analysis of protein structure from egg whites and red blood cells showed that sugarbirds are derived specialists of African starlings. Genetically, the Promerops genus is most closely related to the Cinnyricinclus and Onychognathus genera. It is today classified as its own family.

Presently 2 subspecies of Gurney's sugarbird are recognized, Promerops gurneyi gurneyi and Promerops gurneyi ardens. P. g. ardens was recognized in 1952 and arose from an isolated population of Gurney's sugarbird located in high-elevation areas of Eastern Zimbabwe and the adjacent Mozambique. The ranges of the two subspecies do not overlap, and they occupy different types of habitats.

== Distribution and habitat ==
Gurney's sugarbird is a species endemic to Southern Africa. The distribution is fragmented, and these birds are mainly found in elevated regions in north-eastern Mountain Sourveld and north-eastern Sandy Highveld in the Transvaal and Natal regions. They are also found in Highland and Dohne Sourvelds of Natal and into the Eastern Cape and Limpopo provinces. An isolated population of P. g. ardens is located in the highlands of Eastern Zimbabwe and adjacent Mozambique. Gurney's sugarbirds are short-distance altitudinal migrants and leave their breeding grounds once the flowering season is over.

The preferred habitats is shrubland velds of Southern Africa, dominated by sugarbush (Protea) species of flowering plants. Gurney's sugarbird distribution overlaps silver sugarbush (Protea roupelliae), white protea (P. subvestita), and common sugarbush (P. afra). Because this species is only associated to Protea shrubs, it is very vulnerable to habitat loss and displacement due to fires. The distribution of these birds is restrained by their very specialized diet of sugarbush species' nectar. These birds also feed on nectar from Aloe gardens in suburban areas.

P. g. ardens evolved in an area that lacks silver sugarbush, and it relies on miombo trees (Brachystegia genus) and African protea (P. gageudi), Nyanaga protea (P. dracomontana), beard protea (P. crintita), and common sugarbush (P. afra) species as food resources instead. P. g. ardens lives in riparian woods, on dry slopes with many flowering shrubs such as sugarbush (Protea), bird of paradise flowers (Strelitzia), and coral trees (Erythrina).

== Behaviour ==
=== Vocalizations ===
The song for this species consists of three or four ascending notes, with the final note repeated several times. A "song-spell", songs repeated for an extended period of time, can last up to four minutes. Multiple song-spells strung together and separated by short pauses are called full song periods, and these can last for 20 minutes.

Gurney's sugarbird calls are short, and characterized by a single note, often described as a "chit" sound. The call is more low-pitched than the song, and can be compounded into a "chit-chit-chit" sequence. The call is mostly used when approaching the nest, or as a indicator of well-being once a partner returns to the nest with food, for example. When defending the nest or territory from other birds, Gurney's sugarbird will make a "cloth-ripping" sound.

=== Diet ===
Gurney's sugarbirds are specialized nectarivores and insectivores feeding on Protea species, mainly Protea roupelliae, as well as Protea afra and Aloe in suburban areas. The long, decurved bill is well-adapted to siphon nectar from Protea flower heads. These birds forage for insects and nectar within their defended territory. Insects are usually found hiding within the Protea roupelliae flowers, or caught mid-flight. Main prey orders include Hymenoptera (wasps, bees, sawflies and ants), Coleoptera (beetles), and Hemiptera (true bugs). Adults tend to feed mainly on nectar, and during the breeding season small insects are the main prey items fed to chicks.

=== Reproduction ===
Gurney's sugarbird is a socially monogamous species, meaning that pairs remain together through the breeding season. This season lasts from September, when pairing and nest-building take place, until late February, when the fledglings leave their parents' territory. Females chose their mate based on morphological features (physical attributes) and display flights, which consist of flicking their long tail and the wing-'clacking' of the triangular bulge on their sixth primary feather. Longer tails and larger feather bulges for wing-'clacking' have been associated with greater mating success in males. Display flights also take place when the males chase away encroaching individuals, usually male, from their territory.

Reproductive success in Gurney's sugarbird is highly dependent upon available resources, such as abundant nectar and insects. Males will typically defend these resources, while the females build the nest, incubate the eggs, and feed the nestlings. Clutch size is small (usually 1-2 eggs) and is associated to this species' longer life span (up to seven years, maximum recorded longevity of 13 years). Individuals usually reach sexual maturity in their second or third year of life, and therefore typically survive for an average of five breeding seasons during their lifetime. Incubation lasts 16–17 days and brooding (keeping the chicks warm after hatching) between 19 and 23 days. Both parents participate in the feeding of the nestlings, usually bringing back small winged insects and beetles. Chicks are reliant on their parents for food for the first month of their life.

== Gallery ==
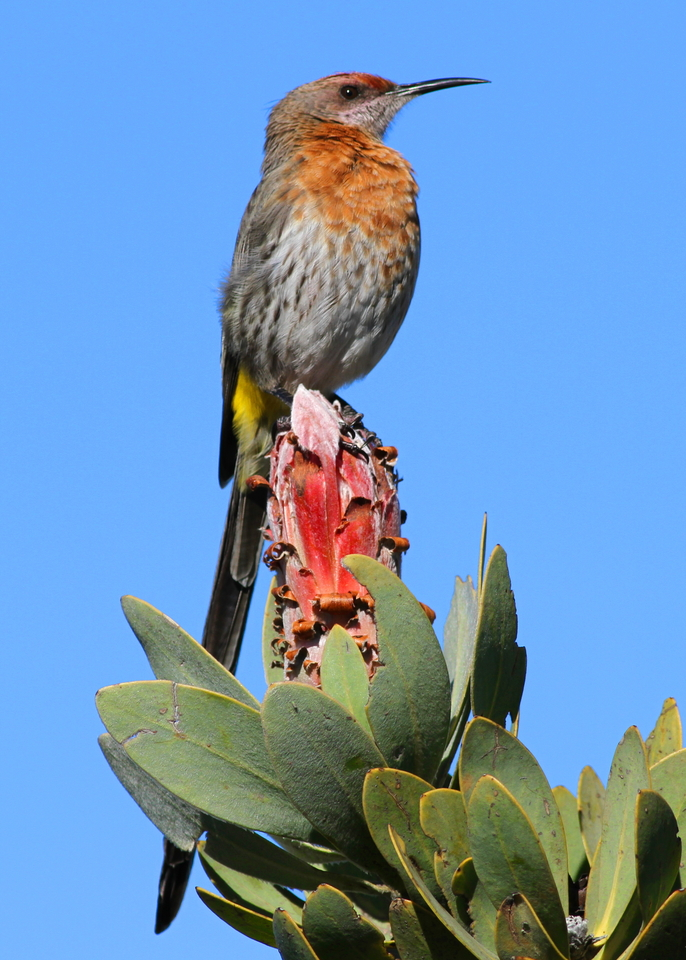
Gurney's sugarbird, at Marakele National Park

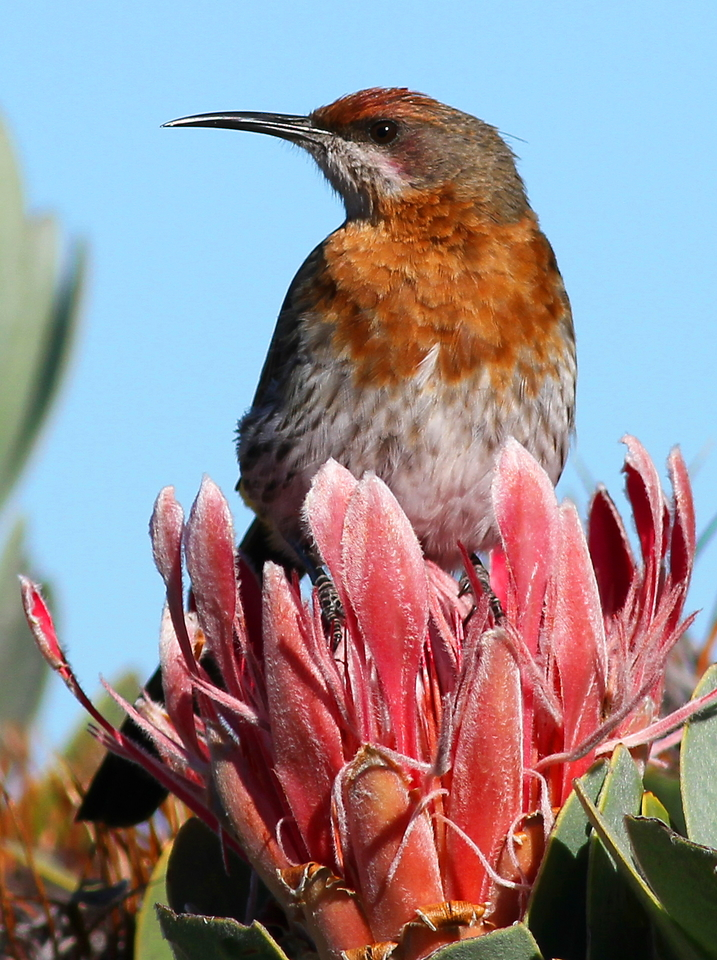
Gurney's sugarbird, at Marakele National Park
