= Pierre Joubert =

Pierre Joubert may refer to:

- Pierre Joubert (viticulturalist) (1664-1732), South African winemaker
- Pierre Joubert (illustrator) (1910–2002), French illustrator and comics artist
- Pierre Joubert (cricketer) (born 1978), South African cricketer
- Pierre Joubert (1701–1766) and Pierre Joubert (1732–1814) of Quebec, a father and son erroneously conflated into one supercentenarian person
