= Jean Roy =

Jean Roy may refer to:

- Jean Roy (music critic) (1916–2011), French music critic and musicologist
- Jean Roy (politician) (1923–1996), Canadian politician
- Jean Sebastien Roy, Canadian motocross rider
- Jean Roy (Huguenot), South African winemaker

== See also ==
- Jean-Yves Roy (born 1949), Canadian politician
