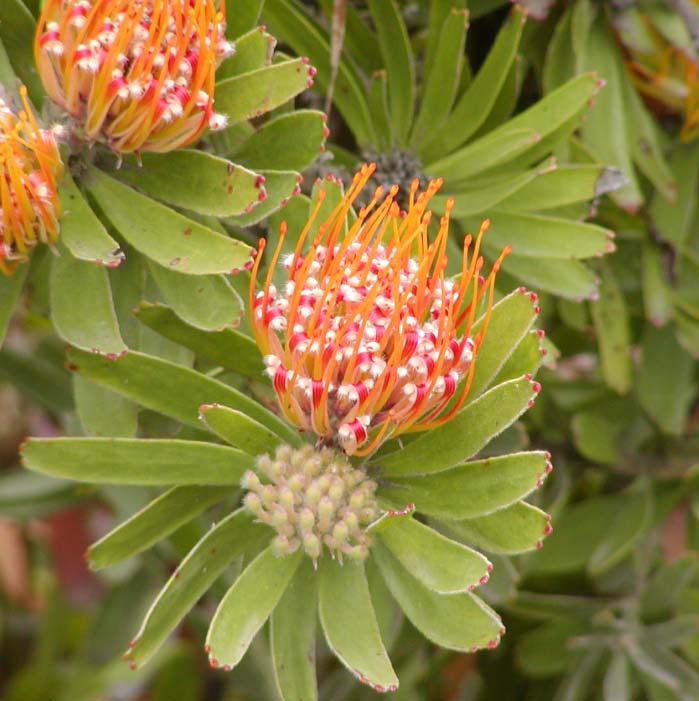

Conservation status
- Least Concern (IUCN 3.1)

Scientific classification
- Kingdom: Plantae
- Clade: Embryophytes
- Clade: Tracheophytes
- Clade: Angiosperms
- Clade: Eudicots
- Order: Proteales
- Family: Proteaceae
- Genus: Leucospermum
- Species: L. erubescens

Binomial name
- Leucospermum erubescens Rourke

Synonyms
- L. attenuatum var. ambiguum

= Leucospermum erubescens =

Species of plant native to South Africa

Leucospermum erubescens is an evergreen shrub of up to 2 m (6 ft) high, with hairless, lancet-shaped to oval leaves with three to seven teeth near the tip of 7–8½ cm (2.8–3.4 in) long and 1–2 cm (0.2–0.4 in) wide, slightly asymmetric, oval flower heads of 5–6½ cm (2–2½ in) in diameter, and usually with four to eight clustered near the end of the branches, with initially yellow flowers, that change to deep crimson, from which long styles stick out, giving the flowerhead as a whole the appearance of a pincushion. It is called orange flame pincushion in English and oranjevlamspeldekussing in Afrikaans. It can be found in South Africa. Flowers may be found between August and January.

== Description ==
The orange flame pincushion is an evergreen upright shrub of 1–1½, at most 2 m (6 ft) high, which has a single stem, and whose branches are covered with a smooth grey bark. The flowering stems are upright and ½–1 cm (0.2–0.4 in) thick and covered by a dense layer of fine cringy hairs. The leaves are hairless, pointing slightly upward, somewhat overlapping, oblong to lance-shaped, with the widest part nearer to the tip, 7–8½ cm (2.8–3.4 in) long and 1–2 cm (0.4–0.8 in) wide, the tip more or less squared off and often with three, sometimes up to seven teeth near the tip.

The oval flower heads are 5–6 cm (2.0–2.4 in) in diameter and set on a 2–3 cm (1.8–2.2 in) long stalk and usually grouped with four to eight together near the end of the stems. They are somewhat asymmetrical with the styles leaning a bit towards the stem. The common base of the flowers in the same head is asymmetric broadly cone-shaped or like half a sphere, about 1.3 cm (0.52 in) in diameter and clearly distinguished from the stalk. The bracts subtending the base are broadly oval, 6–8 mm (0.24–0.32 in) long and about 6 mm wide with a suddenly pointed tip, velvety on the outside, and tidily overlapping each other.

The bracts subtending each individual flower embraces its foot, are rubbery in consistency, about 1 cm (0.4 in) long and 0.7 cm (0.28 in) wide, thickly woolly hairy at base and softly hairy higher up, with a suddenly pointed tip. The 4-merous perianth is straight when in the bud, 3–3½ cm (1.2–1.4 in) long, uniformly silky hairy, yellow when opening but becoming crimson with age. The lowest, fully merged, part of the perianth, called tube, is 1–1.2 cm (0.4-0.48 in) long, slightly laterally compressed, hairless at base and widened and minutely powdery where it merges into the middle part (or claws) where the perianth is split lengthwise, which is silky hairy and coils tidily when the flower opens. The upper part (or limbs), which enclosed the pollen presenter in the bud consists of four narrowly oval lobes of about 3 mm (0.12 in) long, which are softly hairy and also have long stiff hairs. From the perianth emerges a style of 4–5½ cm (1.8–2.2 in) long, bent very slightly in the direction of the centre of the head, initially yellow but later becoming crimson in colour. The thickened part at the tip of the style called pollen presenter is cylinder-shaped with a blunt tip or slightly split in two and about 3 mm (0.12 in) long. The ovary is subtended by four opaque awl-shaped scales of about 2 mm (0.08 in) long.

== Taxonomy ==
The orange flame pincushion was first described by Carl Meissner, who contributed a section on the Proteaceae in 1856 to the series Prodromus Systematis Naturalis Regni Vegetabilis by Alphonse Pyramus de Candolle and called it L. attenuatum var. ambiguum. John Patrick Rourke named it L. erubescens in 1970.

The species epithet erubescens is derived from the Latin erubesco, meaning "I blush", referring to the colour of the flowers which change from yellow to red.

L. erubescens is sometimes called Oudtshoorn pincushion, but this may be confusing since it does not occur near Oudtshoorn.

== Distribution, habitat and ecology ==
The orange flame pincushion has a very limited range on the northern foothills of the Langeberg, where it can be found between Muiskraal and Brandrivier, in a narrow strip of arid fynbos bordering the Little Karoo and an isolated population at Warmbad, situated on the Warmwaterberg. The plants grow on gravel flats or the rocky hill of weathered Table Mountain Sandstone, at elevations between 450–600 m (1,480–1,970 ft). In these locations, the annual precipitation is 250–375 mm (10–15 in), which mainly falls during the winter.

Nectar-feeding birds, such as the Cape sugarbird and several sunbirds pollinate the flowers. Large insects, such as monkey beetles also visit the flower, but do not necessarily brush along the pollen presenters and may be inefficient as pollinators. The fruits are ripe approximately two months after flowering and subsequently fall to the ground. These are collected by ants that carry them underground into their nests. Here, the soft, pale elaiosome is eaten, and the hard, smooth seed remains underground. After a wildfire has destroyed the above ground vegetation, the seeds germinate at 5–10 °C (41–50 °F) at night and 15–20 °C (59–68 °F) during the day, and germination is stimulated by smoke residues in the water.

== Uses ==
L. erubescens is cultivated as cut flower and grown as an ornamental in gardens.

== Conservation ==
L. erubescens is considered rare, but not threatened, because although it has a very limited distribution, its habitat is not at risk of agricultural or urban development.
