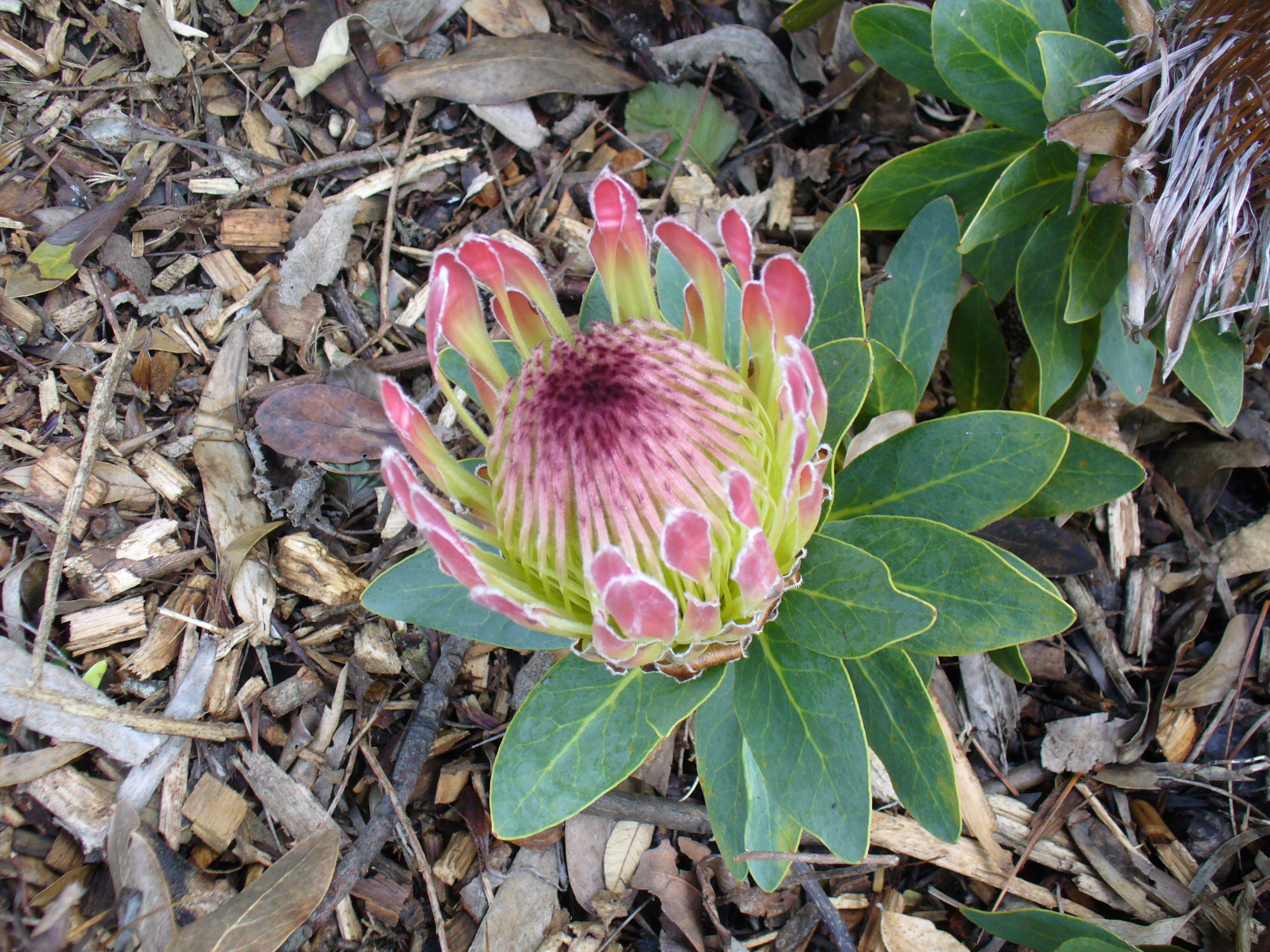

Conservation status
- Least Concern (IUCN 3.1)

Scientific classification
- Kingdom: Plantae
- Clade: Embryophytes
- Clade: Tracheophytes
- Clade: Angiosperms
- Clade: Eudicots
- Order: Proteales
- Family: Proteaceae
- Genus: Protea
- Species: P. roupelliae

Binomial name
- Protea roupelliae Meisn.

= Protea roupelliae =

Silver sugarbush

Species of bush

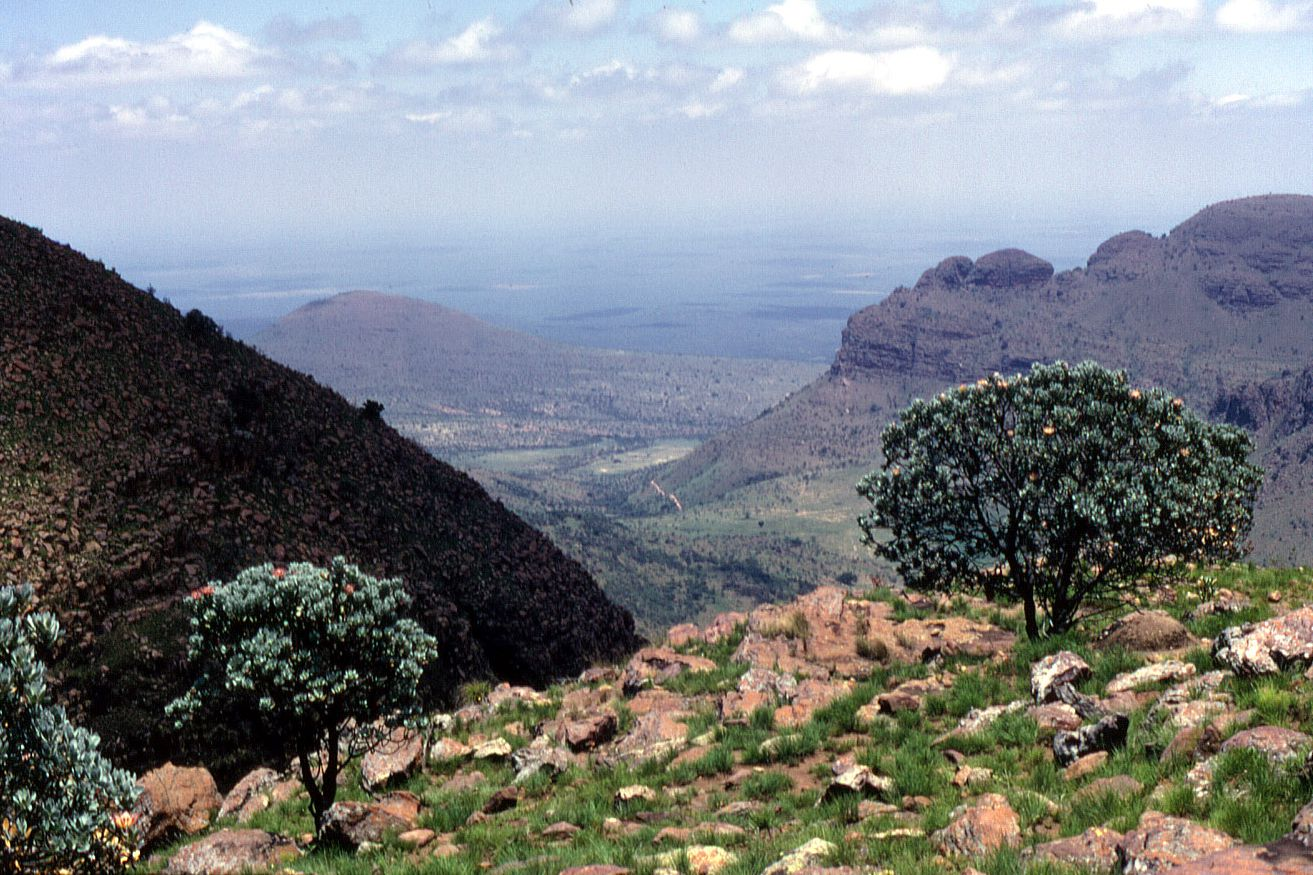
Protea roupelliae at Kransberg in the Transvaal Waterberg

Protea roupelliae is a species of Protea in the large family Proteaceae, and was named to commemorate Arabella Elizabeth Roupell (1817–1914) who spent two years in Cape Town and painted local flowers for her own pleasure. This species is also known as the silver sugarbush.

== Description ==
It is a small tree which grows from three to five metres high on average.

== Taxonomy ==
This species has two subspecies, P. roupelliae hamiltonii and P. roupelliae roupelliae. P. roupelliae hamiltonii is a single-stemmed small shrublet which grows up to 0.3 metres tall. P. roupelliae roupelliae, on the other hand, may grow to be a small tree of about 8 metres in height.

Protea roupelliae is placed in the subfamily Proteoideae, which is found mainly in Southern Africa. This subfamily is defined as those species having cluster roots, solitary ovules and indehiscent fruits. Proteoideae is further divided into four tribes: Conospermeae, Petrophileae, Proteae and Leucadendreae. The genus Protea, and hence P. roupelliae, is placed under the tribe Proteae.

The Proteaceae comprises about 80 genera with about 1600 species. It has Gondwanan distribution, which means that it is mainly spread across the Southern Hemisphere, from Southern Africa, across to Australia, to South America, although certain species are also found in equatorial Africa, India, southern Asia and Oceania as well.

== Distribution and habitat ==
Protea roupelliae is found in eastern South Africa, on the quartzite ridges of Johannesburg, in the Waterberg Biosphere and northwards into Zimbabwe. It grows in grasslands and in hilly terrain. The hamiltonii subspecies is restricted to quartzite soils where clay has been leached at 1300 metres altitude. The roupelliae subspecies is more adaptable and may grow in a variety of soils at varying altitudes (0-2400m), and is more widespread.

== Ecology ==
This plant, especially P. roupelliae roupelliae, may flower at any time of the year, but most commonly in February and April, just after the summer rains. P. roupelliae is pollinated by many species such as beetles, bees and sunbirds; Gurney's sugarbird has a close relationship with the plant.

== Cultivation ==
This plant may be grown in gardens for its beauty and to attract wildlife to the garden.
