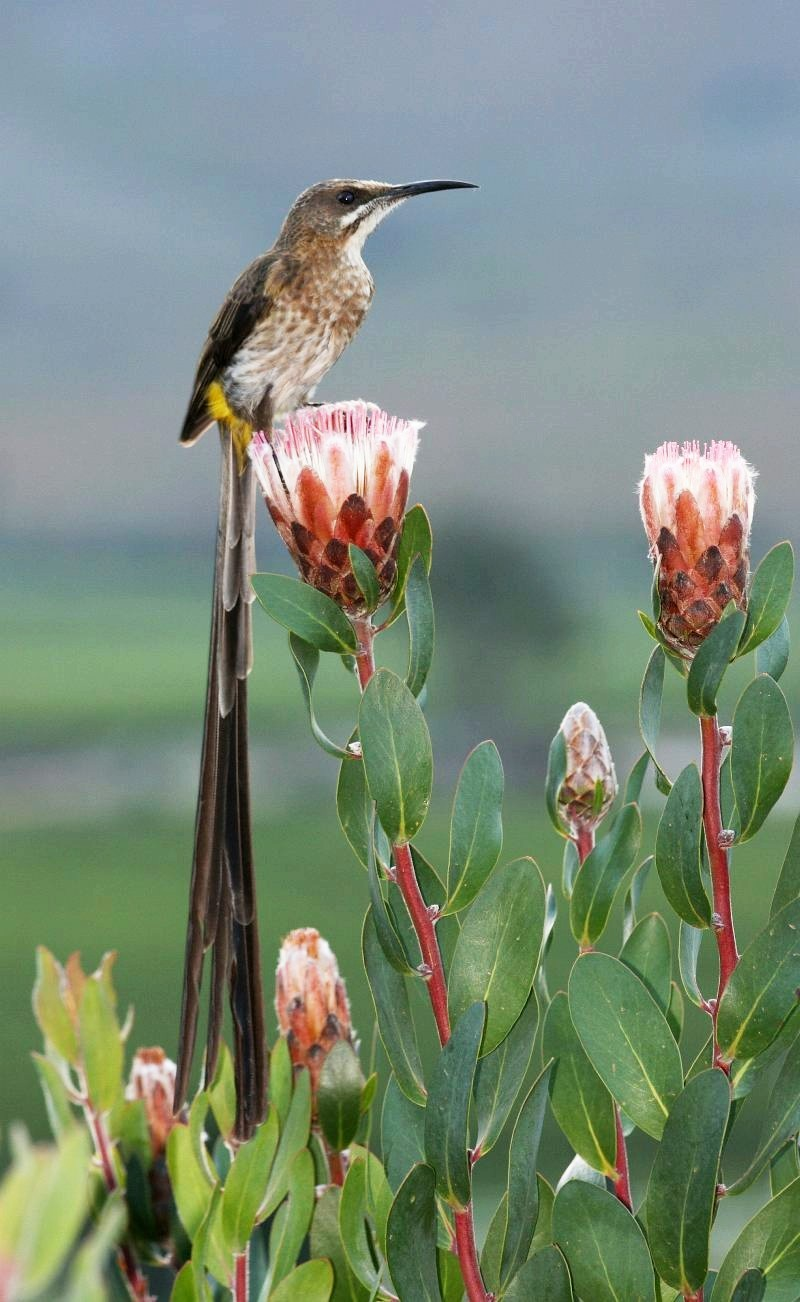
- Male in South Africa

Conservation status
- Least Concern (IUCN 3.1)

Scientific classification
- Kingdom: Animalia
- Phylum: Chordata
- Class: Aves
- Order: Passeriformes
- Family: Promeropidae
- Genus: Promerops
- Species: P. cafer

Binomial name
- Promerops cafer (Linnaeus, 1758)

Synonyms
- Merops cafer Linnaeus, 1758

= Cape sugarbird =

Species of bird

The Cape sugarbird (Promerops cafer) is one of the eight bird species endemic to the Fynbos biome of the Western Cape and Eastern Cape provinces of South Africa.

== Taxonomy ==
The Cape sugarbird was formally described in 1758 by the Swedish naturalist Carl Linnaeus in the tenth edition of his Systema Naturae. He placed it with the bee-eaters in the genus Merops and coined the binomial name Merops cafer. Linnaeus specified the type locality as Ethiopia but this was changed to the Cape of Good Hope by the French zoologist Mathurin Jacques Brisson in 1760. The Cape sugarbird is now placed in the genus Promerops that was introduced for the species by Brisson in 1760. The species is monotypic: no subspecies are recognised.

== Description ==
The Cape sugarbird is a grey-brown bird that is easily recognisable by a spot of yellow under its tail and the very long tail feathers present in males. The male is 34–44 cm long, and the shorter-tailed, shorter-billed, and paler breasted female 25–29 cm long. Another characteristic of the Cape sugarbird is the sound it makes when it flies. The main flight feathers are arranged in such a way that when the bird beats its wings, a frrt-frrt sound is made with the intention of attracting females.

== Distribution and status ==
The Cape sugarbird is distributed throughout most of the fire driven ecosystem of the Fynbos in South Africa, the dominant vegetation type of the Cape Floral Region where there are flowering proteas and ericas. It is most common in areas that have not burnt recently, and almost absent from recently burnt areas. It is also found in gardens in summer when most proteas are not in flower, but urban birds are associated with greater stress measures. With a large population and extensive range, the Cape sugarbird is evaluated as Least Concern on the IUCN Red List of Threatened Species.

== Behaviour ==
=== Food and feeding ===
The Cape sugarbird is a specialist nectar feeder when it comes to feeding off Proteaceae. Its long, sharp beak is used to reach the nectar of a variety of species of protea with its long brush-tipped tongue. The staple diet of this sugarbird is nectar; however, it will also eat spiders and insects. The characteristic strong winds in the Cape may make feeding off protea heads difficult, but the Cape sugarbird has adapted to this with the development of sharp claws.

=== Breeding ===
The breeding season for the Cape sugarbird is winter when food supplies are ample. Breeding males set up territories in mature stands of Protea bushes, where they perform vocal displays.

== Gallery ==
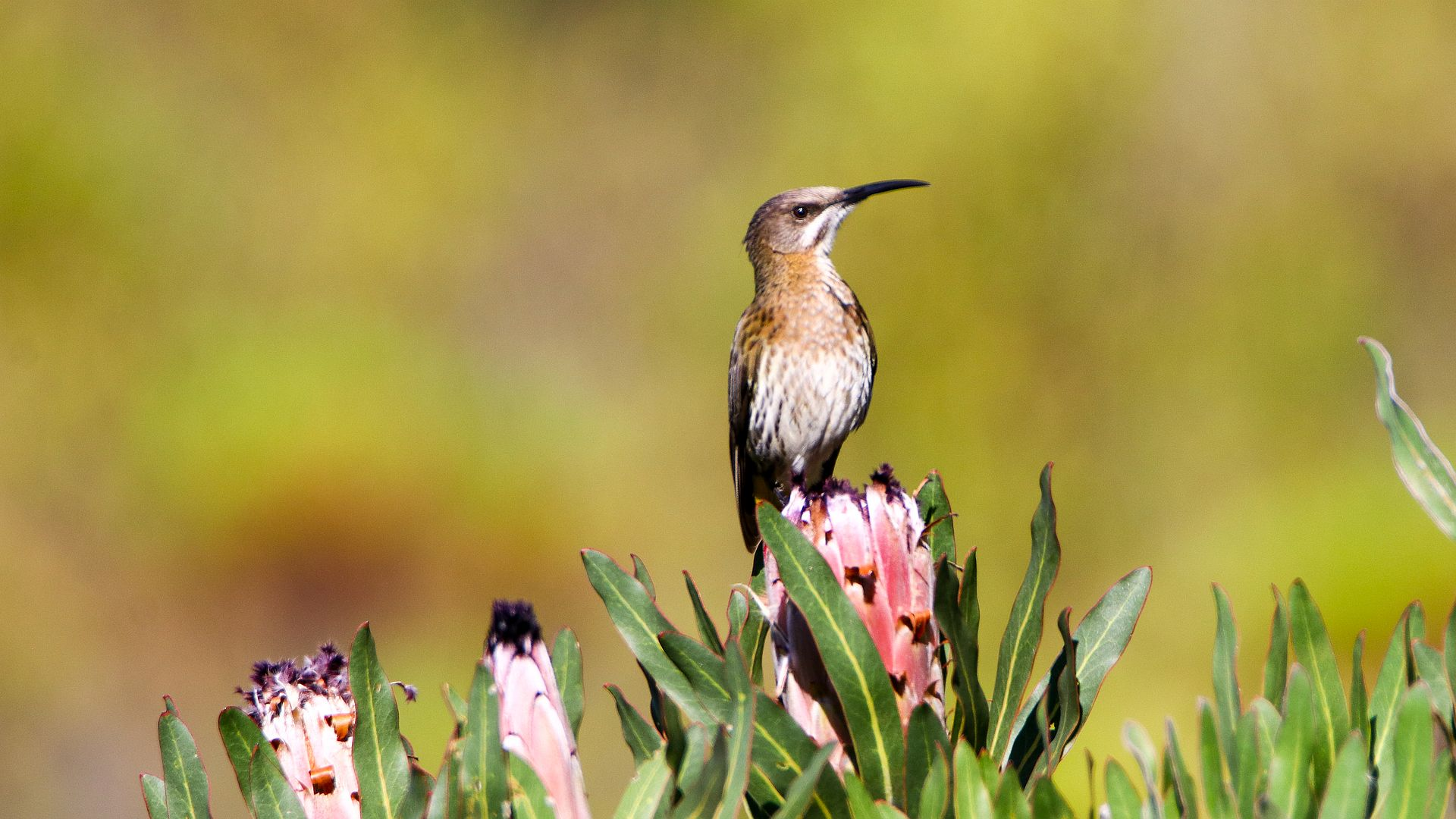
Cape sugarbird

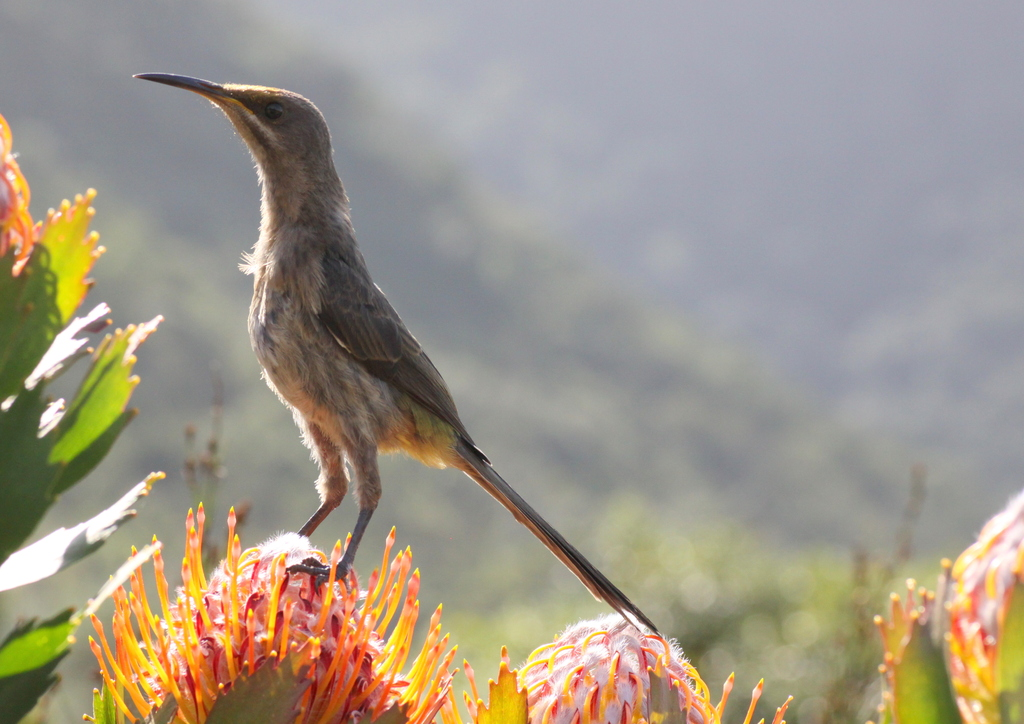
Female in South Africa

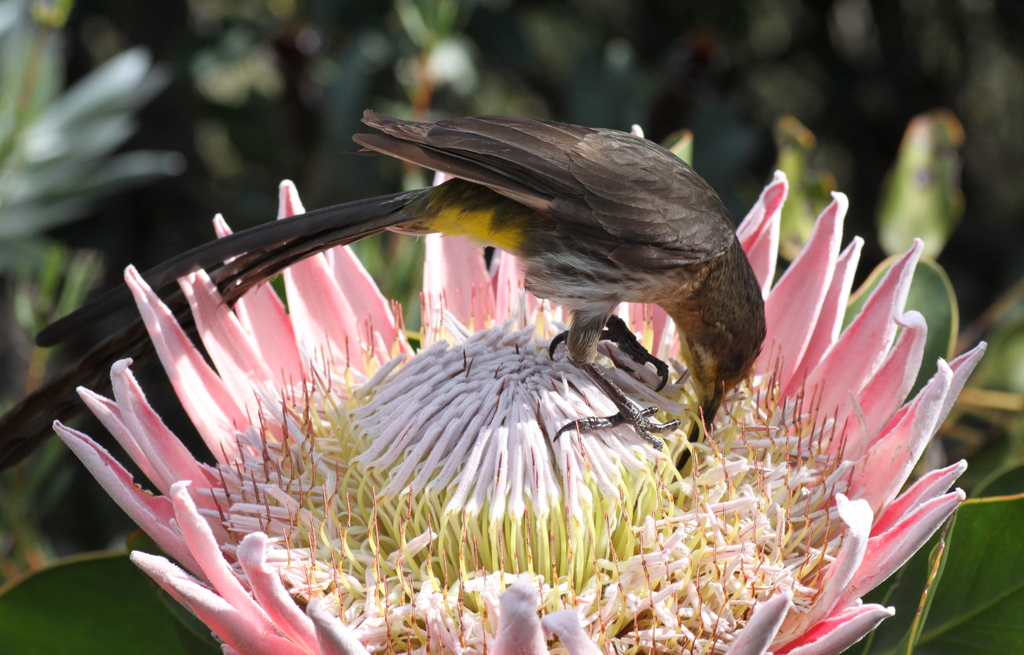
Male drinking nectar from a Protea cynaroides in South Africa
