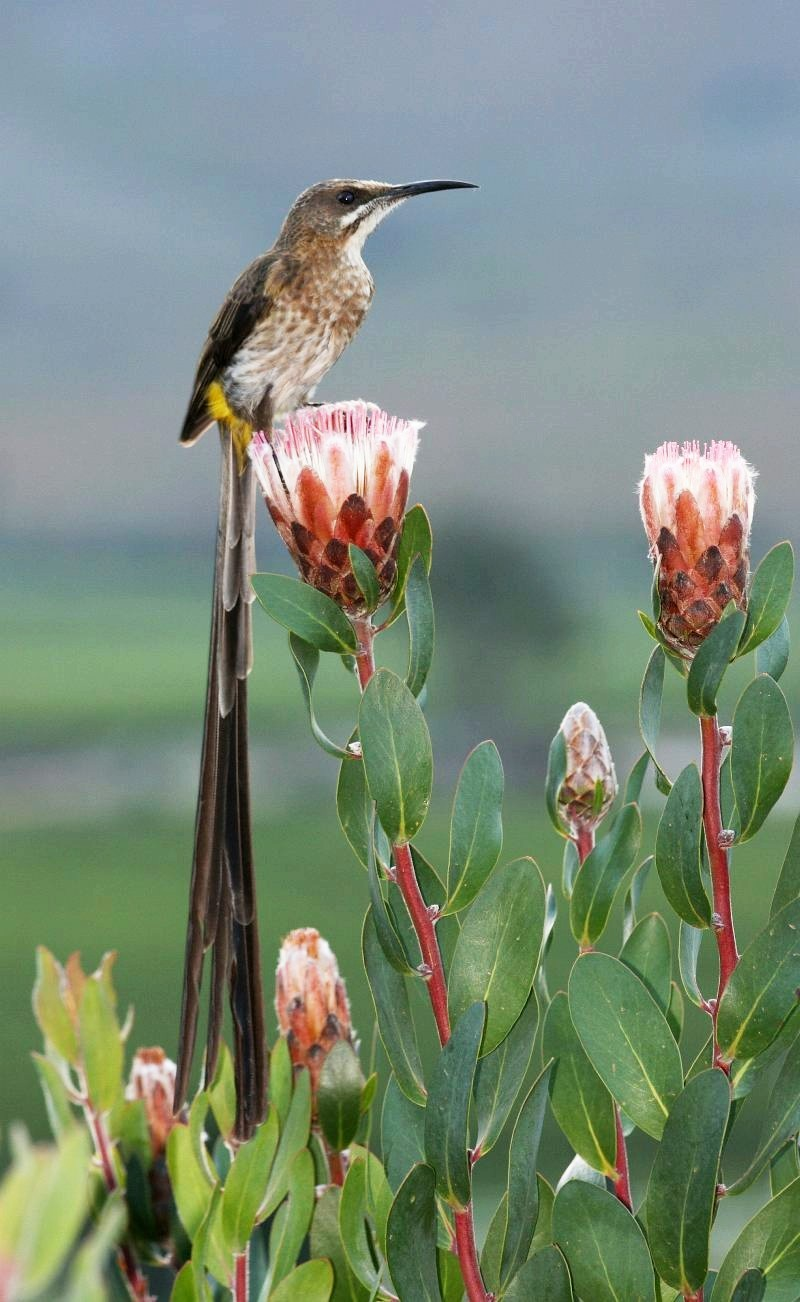
- Male Cape sugarbird (Promerops cafer)

Scientific classification
- Kingdom: Animalia
- Phylum: Chordata
- Class: Aves
- Order: Passeriformes
- Parvorder: Passerida
- Family: Promeropidae; Vigors, 1825
- Genus: Promerops; Brisson, 1760

Type species
- Merops cafer Linnaeus, 1758

Species
- See text

= Sugarbird =

Genus of birds

The sugarbirds are a small genus, Promerops, and family, Promeropidae, of passerine birds, restricted to southern Africa. In general appearance and habits, they resemble large, long-tailed sunbirds or some of the Australian honeyeaters, but are not closely related to the former and are even more distantly related to the latter. They have brownish plumage, the long downcurved bill typical of passerine nectar feeders, and long tail feathers.

== Taxonomy and systematics ==
The genus Promerops was introduced by the French zoologist Mathurin Jacques Brisson in 1760 with the Cape sugarbird (Promerops cafer) as the type species. The name of the genus combines the Ancient Greek προ pro "close to" or "similar" and the genus Merops that contains the bee-eaters.

The relationships of the sugarbirds have been a source of considerable debate. They were first treated as a far-flung member of the honeyeater family, which is otherwise restricted to the Australasian region. Using egg white proteins in the 1970s, Sibley and Ahlquist mistakenly placed them with the starlings (the samples used were actually those of sunbirds). They have also been linked to the thrushes (Turdidae) and the sunbirds. Molecular studies find support for few close relatives, and they are treated as a monotypic family at present, although they form a clade with the Modulatricidae, three enigmatic African species formerly placed with the Old World babblers and thrushes.

=== Genetic diversity ===
Both species have been shown to exhibit exceptionally high genetic diversity at both microsatellite and mitochondrial loci, with no signs of inbreeding and large effective population sizes.

== Species ==
The genus contains two species:

Image	Scientific name	Common name	Distribution
	Promerops gurneyi	Gurney's sugarbird	Lesotho, Mozambique, South Africa, Swaziland, and Zimbabwe
	Promerops cafer	Cape sugarbird	Western Cape and Eastern Cape provinces of South Africa.

== Description ==
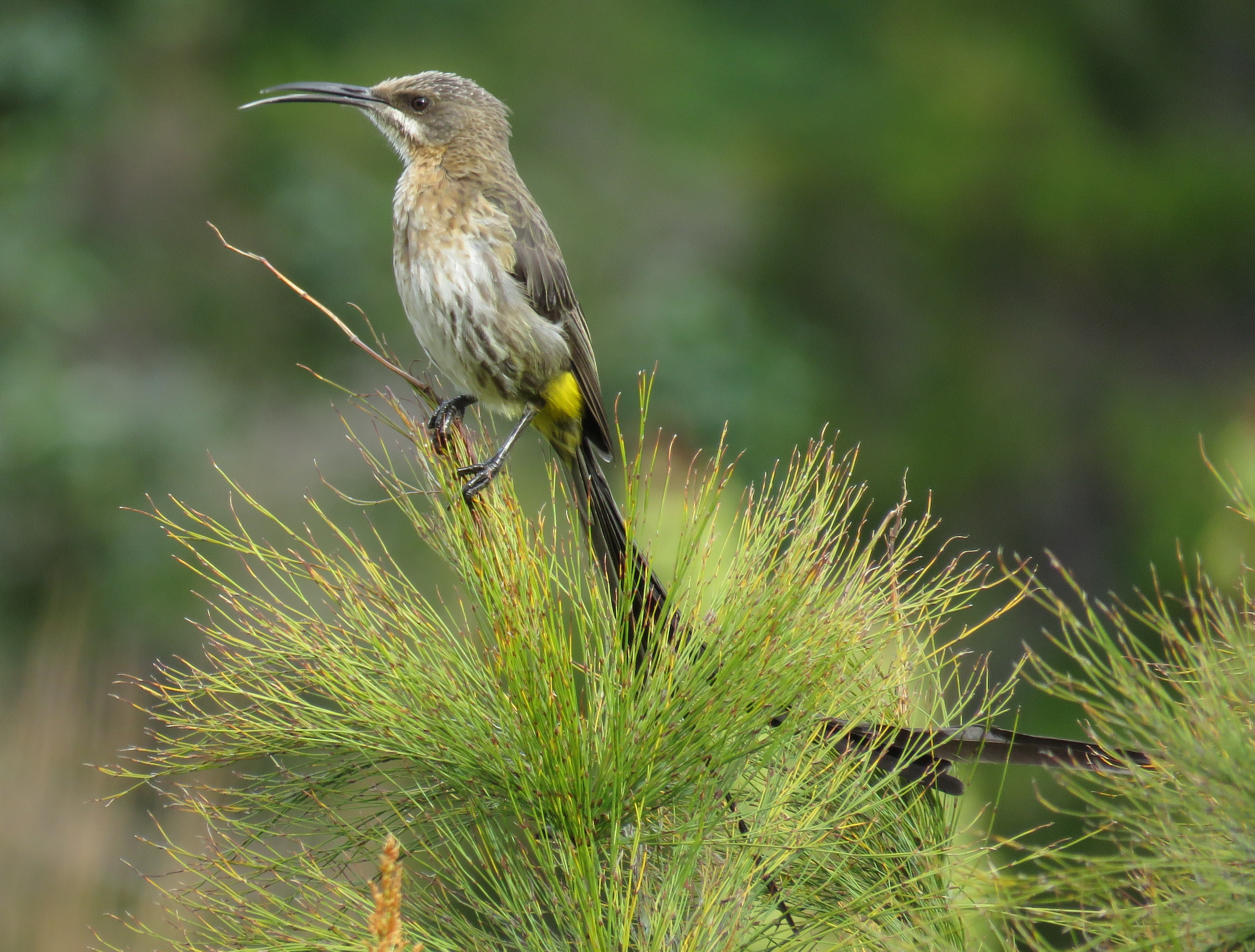
Female cape sugarbird, note the protruding tongue

The two sugarbird species are medium-sized passerines that weigh between 26 and 46 g (0.92 and 1.62 oz) and are 23 to 44 cm (9.1–17.3 in) in length. Between 15 and 38 cm (5.9 and 15.0 in) of that length is in their massively elongated tails, the tails of the Cape sugarbird being overall longer than those of Gurney's sugarbird. In both species, the tail of the male is longer than the female, although the difference is more pronounced in the Cape sugarbird. In overall body size, the males are slightly larger and heavier than the females. Both species have long and slender bills that are slightly curved, and again the females have a slightly shorter bill, leading to differences in feeding niches. The skull and tongue morphologies of the sugarbirds are very similar to that of the honeyeaters, the result of convergent evolution. The tongue is long and protrusible, and is tubular and frilled at the end.

== Distribution and habitat ==
Gurney's sugarbird is found from Zimbabwe southwards, except the extreme south of South Africa, where it is replaced by the Cape sugarbird in the Cape provinces of South Africa. It has at times been considered conspecific with Gurney's. The distribution of Gurney's sugarbird is disjunct, and currently two subspecies are accepted, one in the north and one further south.

Sugarbirds are dependent on Protea and are found in protea scrub. The Cape sugarbird is found in fynbos and has also moved into gardens and nurseries.

== Behaviour and ecology ==
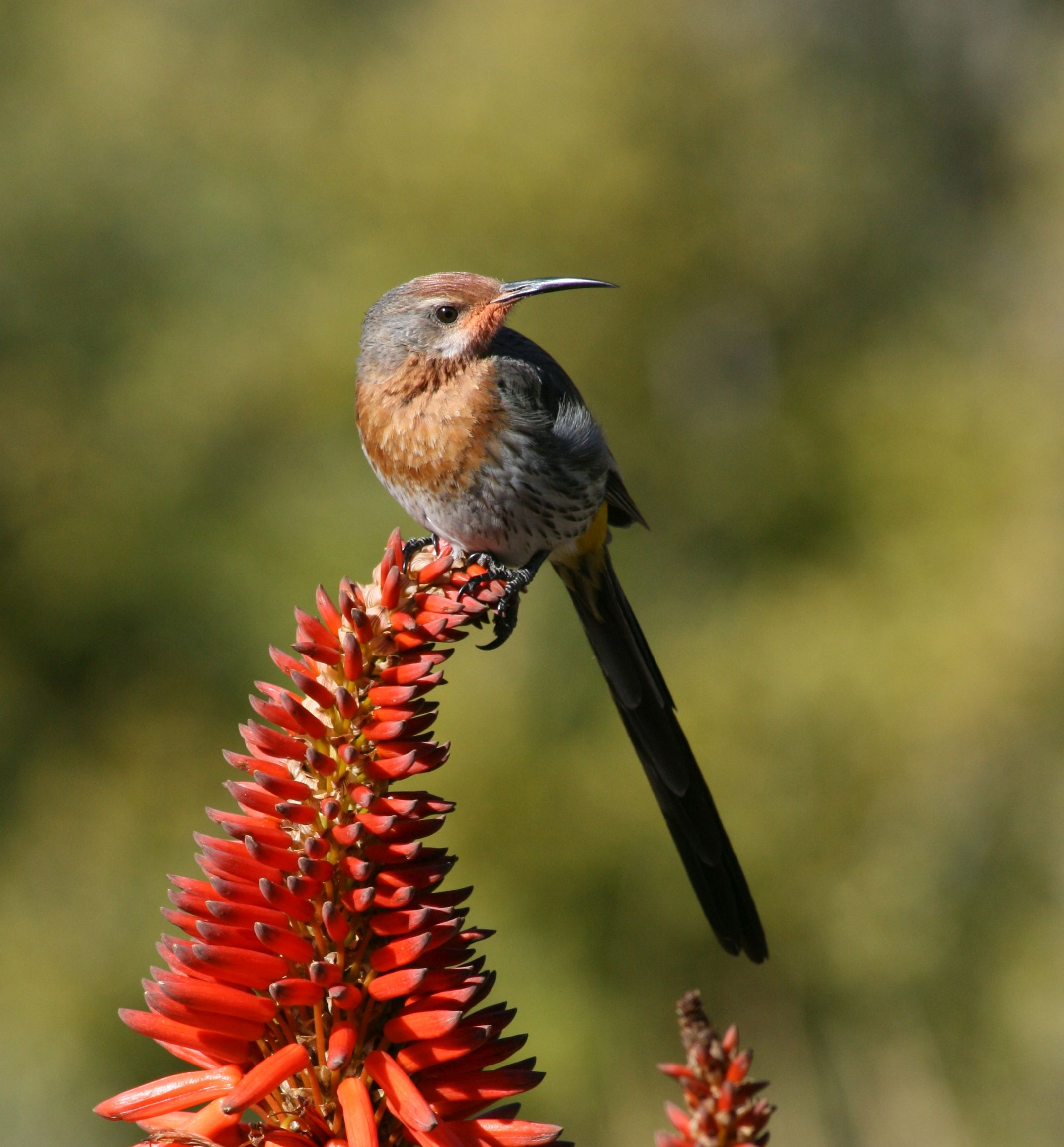
Gurney's sugarbird

Nectar from the inflorescences of the Protea provide most of the energy these birds require, and they are considered significant pollinators of the genus. The birds' diet is supplemented by insects attracted to the inflorescences. Studies of their diets found that bees in the family Apidae and flies formed a large part of the diet and that the insects were obtained by hawking.

The breeding behaviour and nesting habits of the two species of sugarbird are very similar. Sugarbirds are monogamous, and male sugarbirds defend territories during the breeding season. Females lay two eggs in a nest in a fork of a tree.
