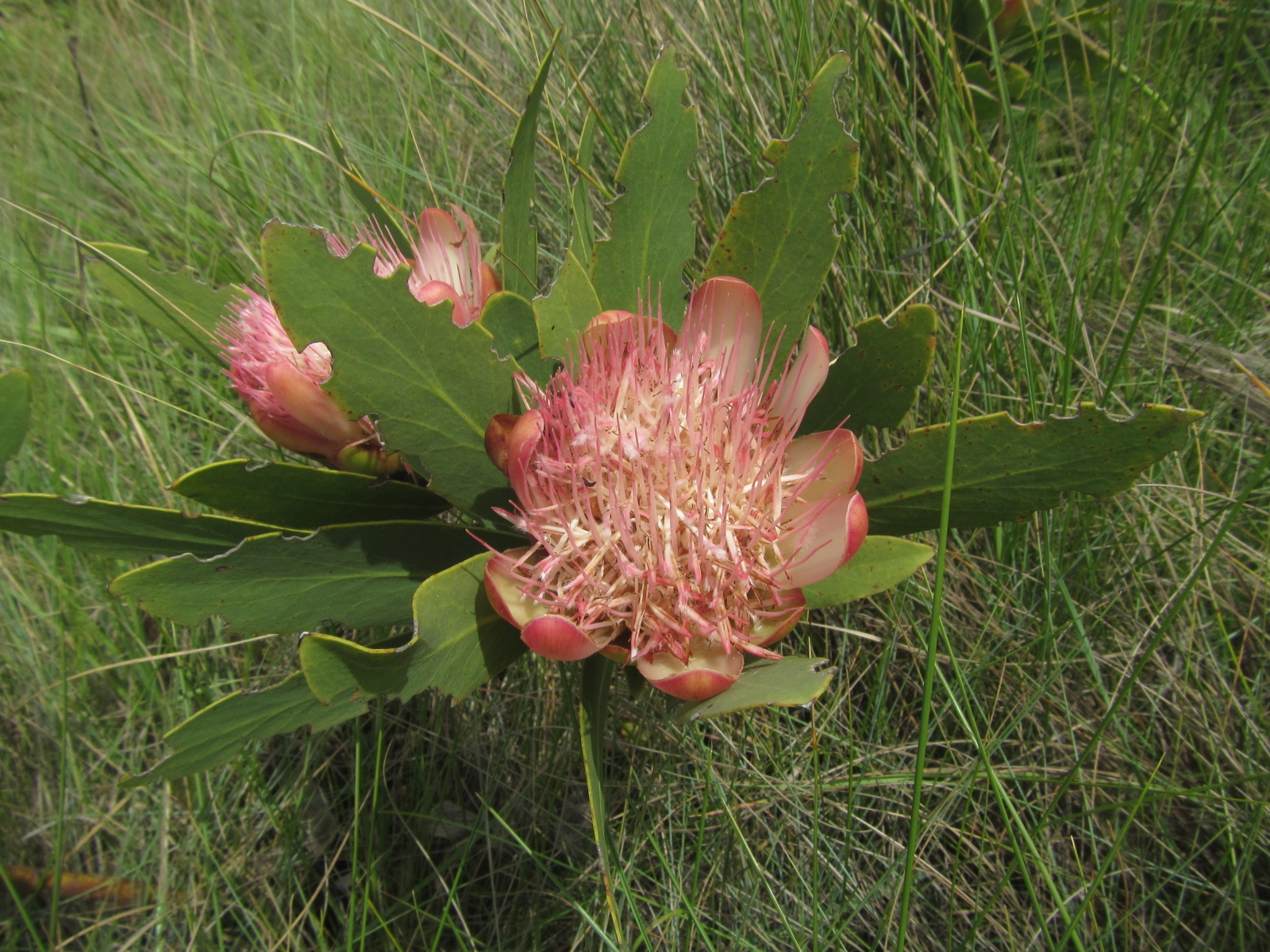

Conservation status
- Least Concern (IUCN 3.1)

Scientific classification
- Kingdom: Plantae
- Clade: Tracheophytes
- Clade: Angiosperms
- Clade: Eudicots
- Order: Proteales
- Family: Proteaceae
- Genus: Protea
- Species: P. dracomontana

Binomial name
- Protea dracomontana Beard

Synonyms
- Protea inyanganiensis Beard

= Protea dracomontana =

Species of flowering shrub

Protea dracomontana, the Nyanga protea or the Drakensberg sugarbush, is a flowering plant that belongs within the genus Protea. The plant is found in the Eastern Cape, Lesotho, KwaZulu-Natal and the escarpment of the Free State, as well as eastern Zimbabwe. In Zimbabwe this species is only known from a disjunct subpopulation confined to the summit of Mount Nyangani.

Another vernacular name for this plant is Drakensberg dwarf sugarbush. In Afrikaans it is known as the Drakensbergse dwergsuikerbos.

== Taxonomy ==
This species was first described by John Stanley Beard in 1958, from a specimen, the holotype, which he had collected on Mount Nyangani, Zimbabwe.

Protea inyanganiensis is an (illegitimate) synonym for the Zimbabwe population created by Beard in 1993.

== Description ==
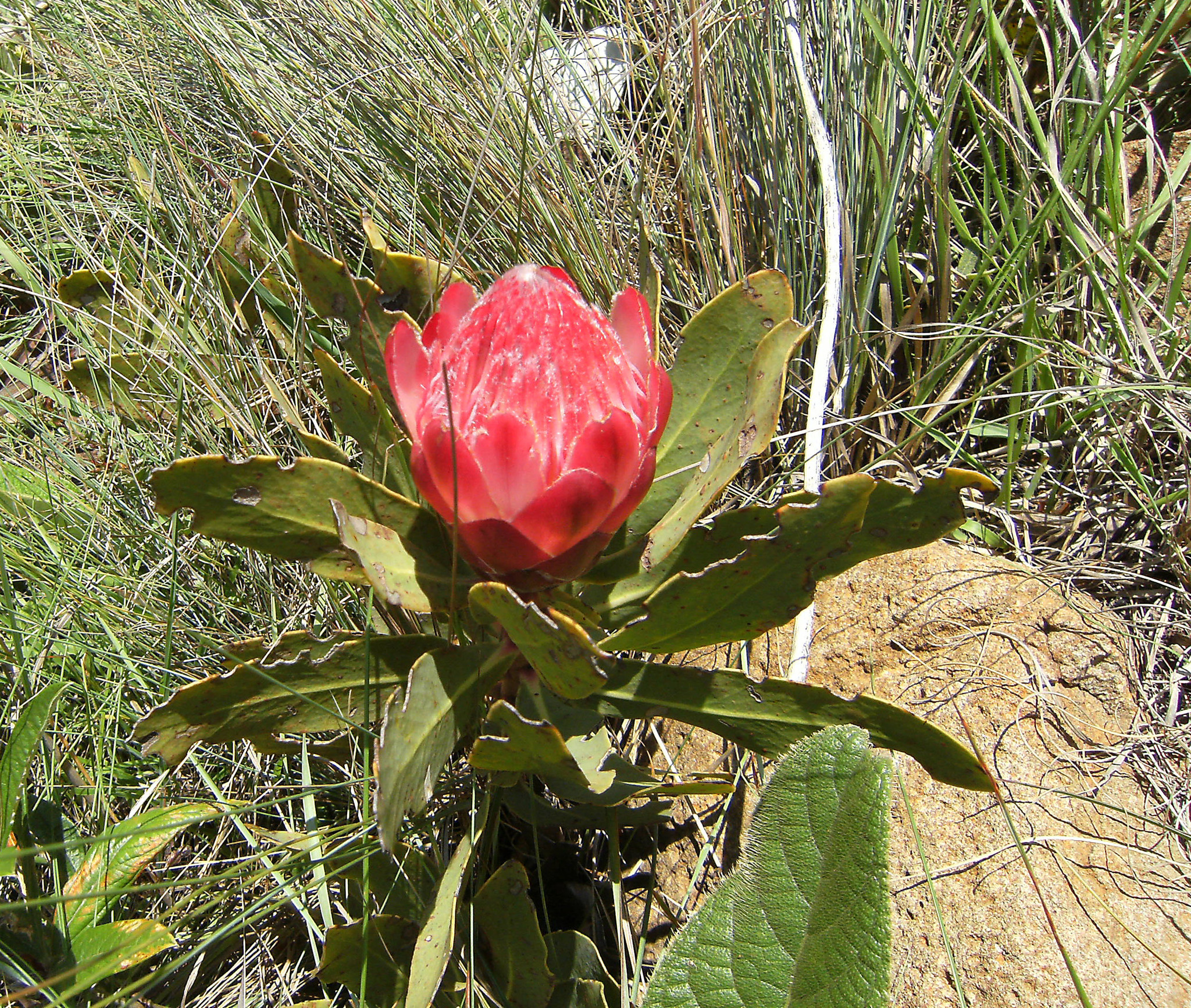

It is a shrub which has numerous stems and grows up to 1.5 metres high, often less. The plant blooms mainly from January to March. This species is monoecious with both sexes in each flower. The flowers are grouped together in a tight-packed inflorescence ('flower-head'), surrounded by petal-looking bracts, which is 6–9 cm in diameter, and is coloured creamy-white, often tinged with pink at the tips of the innermost bracts and the flowers.

The stems are reddish-brown to grey, glabrous and smooth to the touch.

It is extremely similar to Protea afra subsp. gazensis in Zimbabwe, which occurs contemptuously at lower altitudes than P. dracomontana, and P. afra subsp. afra in South Africa, for which the same applies. It is primarily distinguished from these taxa by having shorter inflorescences and a short, squat, bushy habitus. Rourke (1980) states possible hybrids between the two may exist.

== Ecology ==
This species can re-sprout again after wildfires from a bole-shaped rootstock, although it seems to need some protection from wildfires and is always found growing among rocks. Pollination occurs through the action of birds and insects. The seed is not stored on the plant, is released nine to twelve months after the flowers are formed, and is dispersed by action of the wind.

The plant grows in alpine grasslands and among rocks at heights of 1,600 m to 2,200 metres in South Africa, and peaty tussock grassland at 2,300 to 2,400 metres altitude, perhaps higher, at the summit of a single mountain in Zimbabwe.

== Conservation ==
It is not in danger of extinction. It has declined somewhat in the Drakensberg foothills due to habitat loss caused by agriculture, timber plantations and expanding rural settlements. It may be locally extinct in Lesotho. Nonetheless, it is widespread and common in the Drakensberg Mountains of KwaZulu-Natal and adjacent areas in the Free State Province. It is rare in Zimbabwe.
