= Jean Roy (Huguenot) =

- Born: Lourmarin
- Died: Cape Colony
- Occupation: winemaker

Jean Roy, whose Provençal name was more probably Jean Rey, was a winegrower of Vaudois origin, settled in Lourmarin in the Luberon who emigrated to Dutch Cape Colony in 1688.

== Biography ==
Three years after the revocation of the Edict of Nantes, Jean Roy fled France and joined the Huguenots of South Africa, in the region of Franschhoek, near Stellenbosch and Cape Town, where he founded the domain of L'Ormarins.

Jean and his brother Jacques Roy came from the village of Lourmarin, in the Vaucluse. They embarked in Rotterdam aboard the Berg China, with Pierre Joubert, a huguenot from La Motte-d'Aigues, 10 kilometres from Lourmarin, and arrived in Cape Town six weeks later, on 4 August 1688.

Two others of the first 178 Huguenots of South Africa came from Lourmarin, Jeanne Cordier and Jeanne Mille. Five came from Cabrières-d'Aigues, ten from La Motte-d'Aigues, four from Lacoste, two from La Roque d'Antheron, one from Sivergues and eleven from Saint-Martin-de-la-Brasque. The South African domain of Haute Cabrière is inspired by that of Cabrières-d'Aigues.

By 1694 he had replanted 4000 Chardonnay plants at the foot of the Drakenstein.

Jean Roy married Marie-Catherine Lefébure in 1712, who was also from Provence, after a first marriage with Jeanne Jolly.

His name died out in South Africa, one of his sons having had only two girls.

== The domain of L'Ormarins ==
Jean Roy sold his estate to Pierre Joubert around 1712, which expanded the La Motte vineyard, founded by Pierre Joubert.

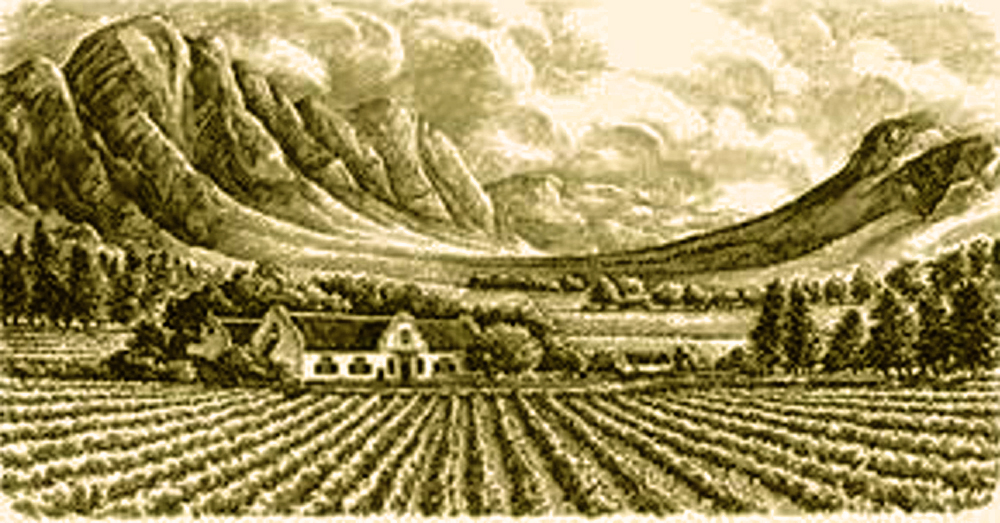
L'Ormarins Wine Estate at the foot of the Groot Drakenstein in Franschhoek

This property was bought in the 20th century by billionaire Anton Rupert, who in 1969 made it the foundation stone of an empire that had become the world’s second-largest luxury company behind LVMH. The current owner is his daughter, the mezzo-soprano Hanneli Koegelenberg.
