= Pierre Joubert (viticulturalist) =

Winemaker (1664–1732)

- Born: 1664; La Motte-d'Aigues, Provence
- Died: 1732 (aged 67–68); Cape Colony
- Occupation: winemaker

Pierre Joubert (1664–1732) was a Huguenot winemaker born in La Motte-d'Aigues.

== Biography ==
After the revocation of the edict of Nantes, Pierre Joubert went into exile at the age of 24, leaving La Motte-d'Aigues to reach Rotterdam in the Netherlands. On this occasion, he brought out from France a bible in a loaf of bread, visible in the French Huguenot Memorial Museum in Franschoek, South Africa.

The Dutch offered him the opportunity to settle in the Huguenot refugee community of South Africa, winemakers on whom Dutch merchants relied to supply their customers with wine in the Indian Ocean. He even receives 28.20 pounds from the "bavarian fund" to settle down.

He left Holland in March 1688 on board of the Berg China, a ship of the Dutch East India Company, to reach the Table Mountain on 4 August 1688, near which he founded the village of Provence, after a three-and-a-half-month voyage. Then he founded the village of Lamotte, before that of Bellingham, then in 1709 that of La Roque and a little later the domain of L'Ormarins, created by Jean Roy, another Huguenot from the Luberon and later bought by the billionaire Anton Rupert.

He lost his wife Suzanne Reyne during the crossing during which 19 other people passed away. He married a 20-year-old Breton woman, Isabeau Richard, who had just lost her husband. The couple will have six sons and five daughters, one of whom will be the grandfather of Boer general Petrus Jacob Joubert, who will be minister of justice of Transvaal, one of the first shareholders of gold mines and candidate for the presidency of the Republic, beaten by Paul Kruger.

The estates were quickly sold to merchant Gabriel Dutoit but it was a great-grandson, Gideon Joubert, who bought him in 1915. Pierre Joubert left a Drakenstein's correspondence.
