= Gluckstadt =

Gluckstadt may refer to:

- Glückstadt, a town in the Steinburg district of Schleswig-Holstein, Germany
- Glückstadt, KwaZulu-Natal, a village in South Africa
- Gluckstadt, Mississippi, a city in the U.S. state of Mississippi
