= Mondlo =

- Location within KwaZulu-Natal Location within South Africa
- Coordinates: 27.967°S 30.722°E
- Country: South Africa
- Province: KwaZulu-Natal
- District: Zululand
- Municipality: Abaqulusi

Area
  - Total: 11.18 km^{2} (4.32 sq mi)

Population (2011)
  - Total: 28,871
  - Density: 2,582/km^{2} (6,688/sq mi)

Racial makeup (2011)
  - Black African: 99.6%
  - Coloured: 0.1%
  - Indian/Asian: 0.1%
  - Other: 0.3%

First languages (2011)
  - Zulu: 96.3%
  - S. Ndebele: 1.1%
  - Other: 2.6%
- Time zone: UTC+2 (SAST)

Mondlo is a township in Zululand District Municipality in the KwaZulu-Natal province of South Africa.
