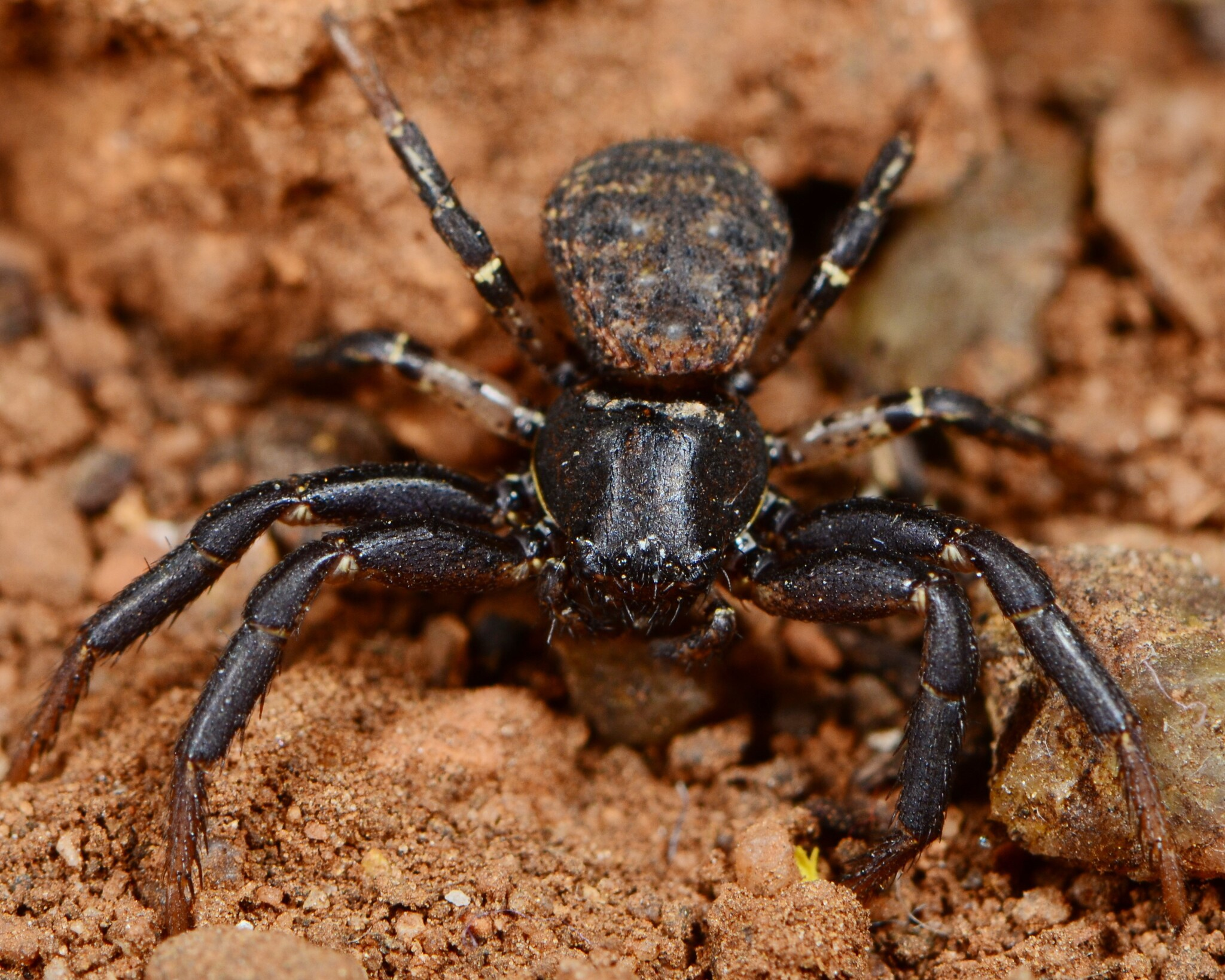

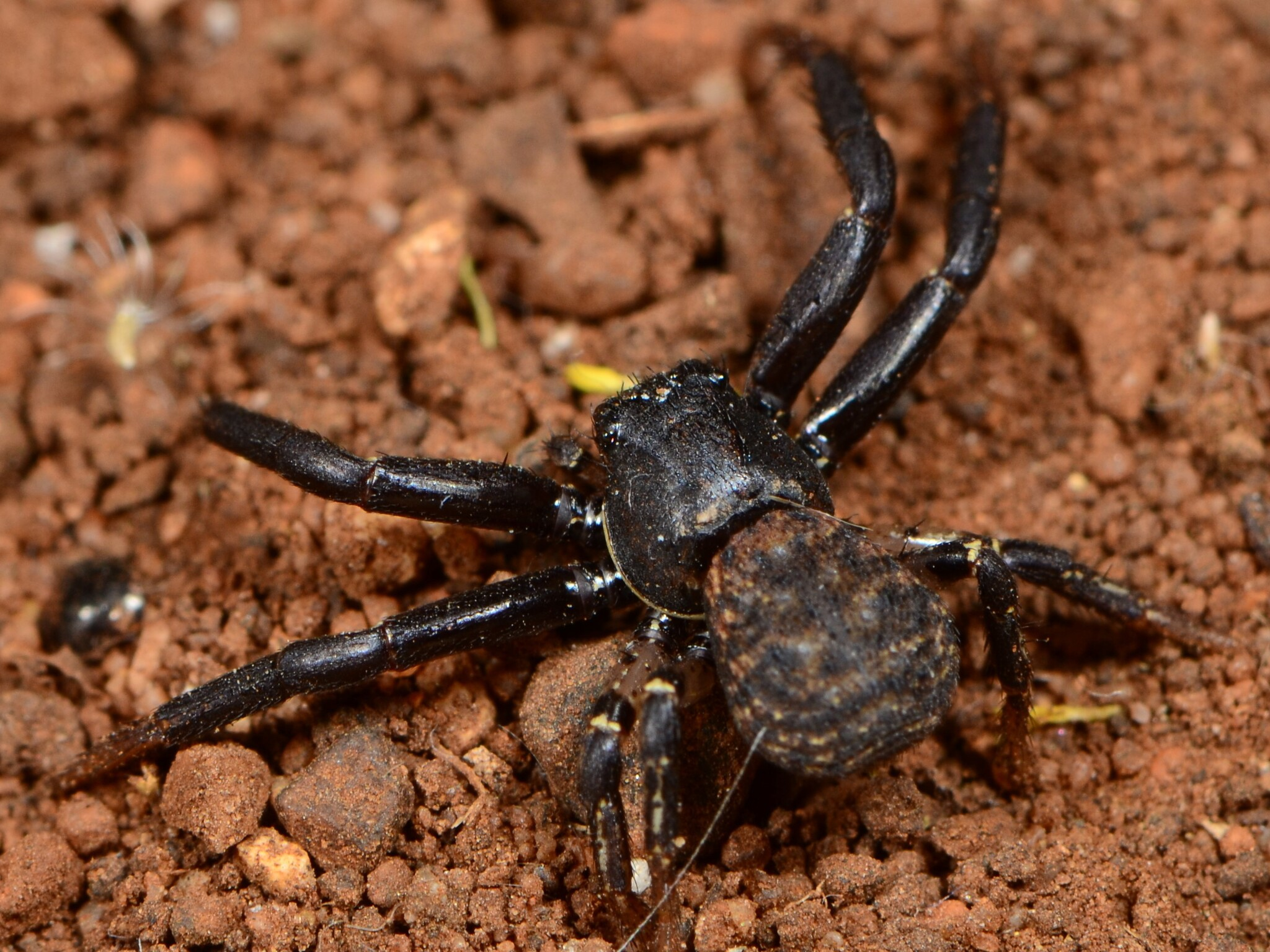
- male

Scientific classification
- Kingdom: Animalia
- Phylum: Arthropoda
- Subphylum: Chelicerata
- Class: Arachnida
- Order: Araneae
- Infraorder: Araneomorphae
- Family: Thomisidae
- Genus: Xysticus
- Species: X. natalensis

Binomial name
- Xysticus natalensis Lawrence, 1938

= Xysticus natalensis =

Common Xysticus Ground Crab Spider

Species of spider

Xysticus natalensis is a species of spider in the family Thomisidae. It occurs in Mozambique, Zimbabwe, Lesotho, Eswatini, and South Africa, and is commonly known as the common xysticus ground crab spider.

== Distribution ==
Xysticus natalensis occurs across five southern African countries: Mozambique, Zimbabwe, Lesotho, Swaziland (now Eswatini), and South Africa. In South Africa, the species is distributed across seven provinces, Eastern Cape, Free State, Gauteng, KwaZulu-Natal, Limpopo, Mpumalanga, and North West. The species occurs at altitudes ranging from 27 to 2,331 m above sea level.

Notable South African locations include Addo Elephant National Park, Erfenis Dam Nature Reserve, Amanzi Private Game Reserve, Ezemvelo Nature Reserve, Irene, Kliprivierberg Nature Reserve, Richards Bay, Umhlali, Ndumo Game Reserve, Ithala Game Reserve, Tembe Elephant Park, Rust de Winter, Lhuvhondo Nature Reserve, Kruger National Park, Blouberg Nature Reserve, Marble Hall, Nelspruit, Brondal, Hartbeespoort Experimental Farm, and Magaliesberg.

== Habitat and ecology ==
Xysticus natalensis is a common species found under stones during the day. The species inhabits fynbos, grassland, and savanna biomes. It has also been found in agricultural crops including avocado, macadamia, cotton, strawberries, and sugar cane. At Ndumo Game Reserve, the species has been found associated with the bark of Vachellia xanthophloea.

== Conservation ==
Xysticus natalensis is listed as Least Concern by the South African National Biodiversity Institute due to its wide geographical range. The species is protected in several protected areas including Addo National Park, Amanzi Private Game Reserve, Blouberg Nature Reserve, Luvhondo Nature Reserve, Ndumo Game Reserve, and Kruger National Park. No conservation actions are recommended.

== Taxonomy ==
The species was originally described by Reginald Frederick Lawrence in 1938 from Umhlali in KwaZulu-Natal. African species of Xysticus have not been revised, and the species is known from both sexes.
