= Abaqulusi Local Municipality =

Settlement in KwaZulu-Natal, South Africa

Abaqulusi
- Local municipality
- Location of Abaqulusi Local Municipality within KwaZulu-Natal
- Coordinates: 27°46′S 30°48′E
- Country: South Africa
- Province: KwaZulu-Natal
- District: Zululand
- Seat: Vryheid
- Wards: 24

Government
  - Type: Municipal council
  - Mayor: Mncedisi Cyril Maphisa (IFP)

Area
  - Total: 4,185 km^{2} (1,616 sq mi)

Population (2011)
  - Total: 211,060
  - Density: 50.43/km^{2} (130.6/sq mi)

Racial makeup (2011)
  - Black African: 95.4%
  - Coloured: 0.5%
  - Indian/Asian: 0.4%
  - White: 3.5%

First languages (2011)
  - Zulu: 91.2%
  - Afrikaans: 3.0%
  - English: 2.5%
  - Southern Ndebele: 1.0%
  - Other: 2.3%
- Time zone: UTC+2 (SAST)
- Municipal code: KZN263

Abaqulusi Municipality (Zulu: UMasipala wabaQulusi) is a local municipality within Zululand District Municipality, in the KwaZulu-Natal province of South Africa. It is named after the abaQulusi, a Zulu clan whose descendants live in the vicinities of Vryheid, Utrecht, Paulpietersburg and Louwsburg. They hailed from different origins but were unified by their allegiance to local Zulu royal homesteads.

== Towns and settlements ==
63% of the population of the AbaQulusi municipal area live in rural areas, most of which live in scattered homesteads known as imizi in tribal areas. Homesteads are of a mixed nature, including both modern dwellings and traditional thatched huts. The remainder of the population lives as tenants on farm or in towns, dormitory townships and shacks in the settlements around towns.

Vryheid is Zululand's main commercial, industrial and business centre, with a reasonably well-developed physical, social and institutional infrastructure. It is located at the intersection of the major transport routes (R34 and R69) that traverse the region.

Other towns and settlements within the municipal boundaries include: Alpha, Calvert, Emondlo, Esigodini, Gluckstadt, Hlobane, Kandaspunt, Lenjanedrif, Louwsburg, Ngobeni, Ngome, Scheepersnek, Steilrand, Stilwater, Swart Umfolozi, Thakazele, and Zungwini.

The main nodal points of the AbaQulusi Municipal area are:

- Vryheid with its central business district and surrounding residential area, together with its former black township Bhekuzulu;
- Louwsburg, an independent settlement area some 67 km northeast of Vryheid and at the entrance to the Ithala Game Reserve;
- Hlobane and Coronation, which have become ghost towns due to decline of the coal mining, and other similar settlements located 25 km to the east of Vryheid;
- eMondlo and the surrounding Tribal Area of Hlahlindlela southwest of Vryheid;
- Khambi Tribal Area and surrounding settlements in the southeastern part of the Municipal area;
- Glückstadt and surrounding settlements in the southern part of the Municipal area;
- Boschhoek and surrounding settlements in the central part of the Municipal area;
- and a number of rural settlement areas around Brakfontein between eMondlo and Vryheid in the western part of the Municipal area.

== Economy ==
Currently the agricultural sector provides the highest proportion of the Gross Geographic Product (GGP) of the AbaQulusi area, even though the area is classified as having low agricultural potential. According to a land potential analysis of the area, only 15% of agricultural land can be described as having high agricultural potential. There is extensive, but not intensive agriculture. Very few farms are irrigated.

Products produced are timber, field crops and livestock. Current products farmed include maize, groundnuts, soya beans, sunflowers, fruits and sorghum.

Coal mining historically provided a major force in the local economy of Northern KwaZulu Natal. However, over the past 15 years a number of mines in the area ceased operation, negatively impacting the regional economy. The AbaQulusi Municipality was particularly affected by the closure of the Coronation, Mnyathi, and Hlobane mines in 1997 and 1998. Recently, the coal mining sector seems to have regained some momentum and it is coming back to dominate the economic sector.

Manufacturing in the municipal area includes food and beverages, clothing and textiles, leather products, paper and paper products, printing and publishing, metal products, machinery and equipment.

Wetlands of national importance abound in the district, with Blood River Vlei being the most important. Over 370 species of birds and many animals, reptiles, insects, amphibians and plants can be seen here, creating a significant potential for ecotourism in the area.

== Politics ==
The municipal council consists of forty-seven members elected by mixed-member proportional representation. Twenty-four councillors are elected by first-past-the-post voting in twenty-four wards, while the remaining twenty-three are chosen from party lists so that the total number of party representatives is proportional to the number of votes received.

In the election of 4 November 2026, again no party won a majority. The IFP obtaining a plurality of twenty seats.

The following table shows the results of the election.

Party	Ward			List			Total seats
Party	Votes	%	Seats	Votes	%	Seats	Total seats
Inkatha Freedom Party	24,580	42.34	18	24,344	41.91	2	20
uMkhonto weSizwe Party	16,194	27.89	3	16,713	28.77	10	13
African National Congress	9,224	15.89	2	8,876	15.28	6	8
Democratic Alliance	3,688	6.35	1	3,775	6.50	2	3
Economic Freedom Fighters	1,149	1.98	0	1,091	1.88	1	1
National Freedom Party	1,110	1.91	0	1,084	1.87	1	1
Freedom Front Plus	1,040	1.79	0	1,048	1.80	1	1
Independent candidates	54	0.09	0				0
15 other parties	1,019	1.76	0	1,151	1.98	0	0
Total	58,058	100.00	24	58,082	100.00	23	47
Valid votes	58,058	98.91		58,082	98.95		
Invalid/blank votes	637	1.09		617	1.05		
Total votes	58,695	100.00		58,699	100.00		
Registered voters/turnout	112,610	52.12		112,610	52.13		

== Challenges ==
The number of individuals infected with HIV/AIDS continues to be a major challenge. HIV/AIDS infections in Abaqulusi grew from 3.97% in 1995 to 19% in 2007. There was a substantial increase (49.89%) in deaths that were due to HIV/AIDS between 1995 and 2007. In 1995, 160 deaths were due to HIV/AIDS and in 2007 there were 2383 HIV/AIDS deaths. Thus in 2007, 41.13% of all reported deaths were due to HIV/AIDS (Abaqulusi Municipality LED Sector Plan, 2009). The HIV and AIDS prevalence rate for the KwaZulu-Natal province as a whole is estimated at 39%. As a result, without proper nutrition, health care and medicine that is available in developed countries, large numbers of people suffer and die from AIDS-related complications. In some areas, the epidemic has left behind many orphans cared for by elderly grandparents. HIV/AIDS also severely halts economic growth by destroying human capital.

Education levels in the area are very low, with 22% of the population having no formal education. 60.15% of the population has some form of primary or secondary education, but only 2.54% have had any further education. Consequently, one of the key challenges facing AbaQulusi Municipality is a relatively high rate of functional illiteracy. This has a significant impact on employability, the type of job opportunities that can be sought and the vocational distribution of the economically active population. The urban centres within AbaQulusi present a slightly better picture with regard to education levels, but generally the skills base remains low.

== Main places ==
The 2001 census divided the municipality into the following main places:

Place	Code	Area (km^{2})	Population
Bhekuzulu	52902	3.67	20,336
Coronation	52903	3.02	2,430
eMondlo	52904	5.78	22,085
Enyati Anthracide Mine	52905	2.60	879
Hlahlindlela	52906	265.13	59,601
Hlobane	52907	24.17	6,042
Kandas Prison	52908	1.08	1,860
Khambi	52909	194.23	1,693
Louwsburg	52910	12.70	3,117
Ndebele	52911	4.49	516
Ngotshe	52912	183.77	1,433
Vryheid	52913	16.74	15,021
Vulindlela	52914	16.12	2,366
Zulu/Khambi	52915	60.70	6,261
Remainder of the municipality	52901	3,389.45	47,386
