= Hlobane =

- Location within KwaZulu-Natal Location within South Africa
- Coordinates: 27.710°S 30.999°E
- Country: South Africa
- Province: KwaZulu-Natal
- District: Zululand
- Municipality: Abaqulusi

Area
  - Total: 17.08 km^{2} (6.59 sq mi)

Population (2011)
  - Total: 7,628
  - Density: 446.6/km^{2} (1,157/sq mi)

Racial makeup (2011)
  - Black African: 99.6%
  - White: 0.2%
  - Other: 0.1%

First languages (2011)
  - Zulu: 96.2%
  - Other: 3.8%
- Time zone: UTC+2 (SAST)
- PO box: 3145
- Area code: 034

Hlobane is a town in Zululand District Municipality in the KwaZulu-Natal province of South Africa.

Coal-mining centre 27 km east of Vryheid and 31 km south-west of Louwsburg. The locality was known as such in the 19th century and the name applied to the town in 1924. Of Zulu origin, it is said by some to mean ‘beautiful place’, and by others ‘place of dispute’. It was the scene of the battle of Hlobane in the Zulu War, on 28 March 1879.

== Bibliography ==
- Ian Knight, Ian Castle, Rorke's Drift : Zulu War, Leo Cooper, UK, 2000. ISBN 9780850526554.
