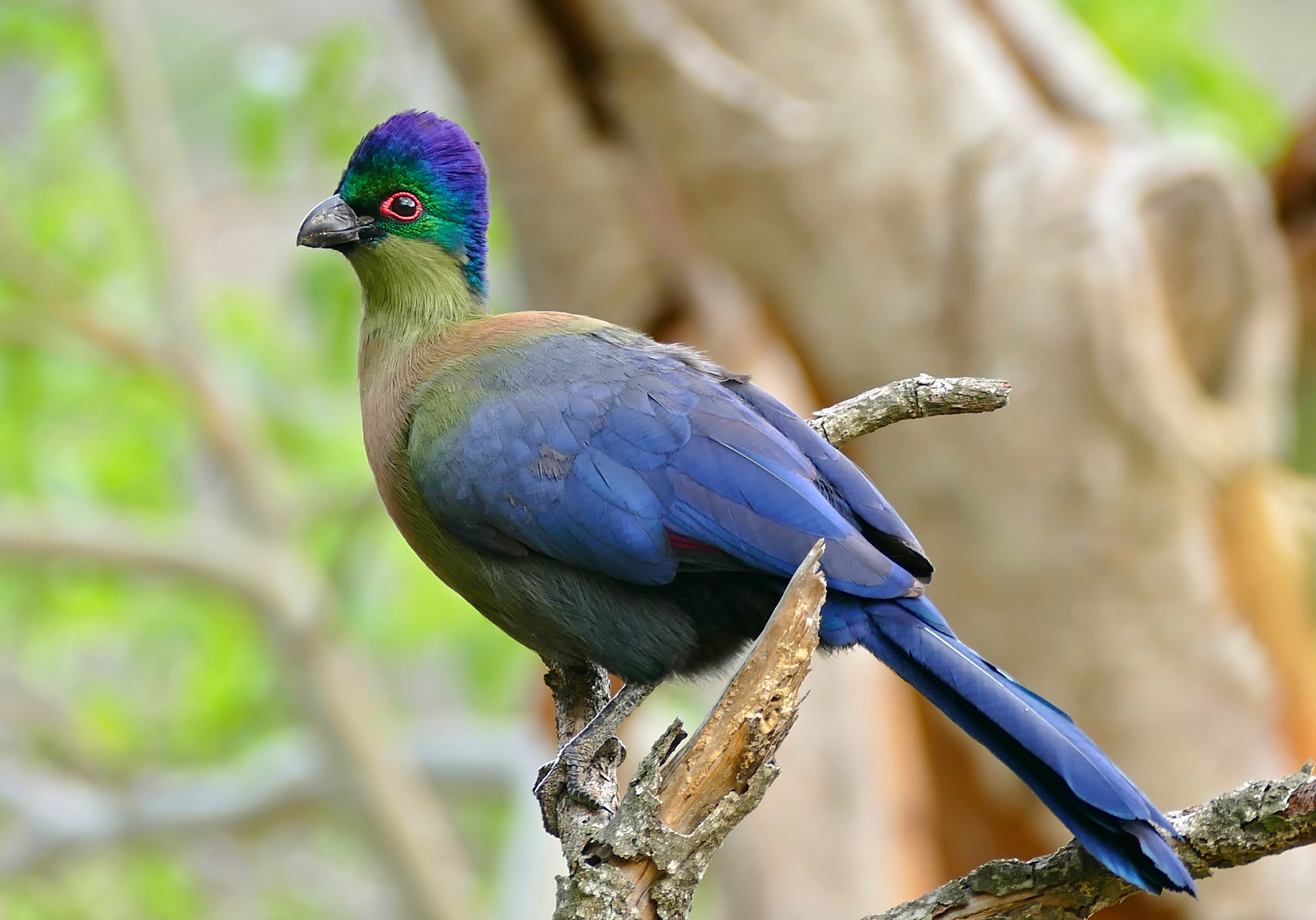
- Nominate race in Ithala G. R.

Conservation status
- Least Concern (IUCN 3.1)

Scientific classification
- Kingdom: Animalia
- Phylum: Chordata
- Class: Aves
- Order: Musophagiformes
- Family: Musophagidae
- Genus: Gallirex
- Species: G. porphyreolophus

Binomial name
- Gallirex porphyreolophus (Vigors, 1831)

Synonyms
- Tauraco porphyreolophus Musophaga porphyreolopha

= Purple-crested turaco =

Species of bird

The purple-crested turaco (Gallirex porphyreolophus) or, in South Africa, the purple-crested loerie, (Khurukhuru in the Luvenḓa (Venḓa) language) is a species of bird in the turaco clade with an unresolved phylogenetic placement. Initial analyses placed the purple-crested turaco in the family Musophagidae, but studies have indicated that these birds do not belong to this family and have been placed in the clade of turacos with an unresolved phylogeny. It is the National Bird of the Kingdom of Eswatini, and the crimson flight feathers of this and related turaco species are important in the ceremonial regalia of the Swazi royal family.

== Description ==
This bird has a purple coloured crest above a green head, a red ring around their eyes, and a black bill. The neck and chest are green and brown. The rest of the body is purple, with red flight feathers.

Purple-crested turacos are considered to be large frugivores that are known to carry cycad seeds from various plant species long distances from feeding to nesting sites. After fruit consumption, they regurgitate the seeds intact where they can germinate nearby. G. porphyreolophus primarily consumes fruits whole like many other large frugivores which are suggested to be necessary for effective ecosystem functioning. Among similar turacos, the purple-crested turaco have faster minimum transit times when consuming smaller seed diets than larger seed diets, and G. porphyreolophus has been shown to have significantly faster pulp (seedless fruit masses) transit time than another closely related Turaco when fed only the pulp of larger-seeding fruits than smaller-seeding fruits.

Purple-crested turacos are primarily frugivorous and have been shown to disperse seeds that germinate comparably to that of manually de-pulped seeds. Turacos are important for seed dispersal and germination, but the purple-crested turaco's digestion of invasive plants still allows for high rates of germination and low seed retention. On the other hand, the invasive species Psittacula krameri (rose-ringed parakeet) has been shown to contain longer seed retention and lower rates of alien-plant germination.

== Habitat ==
They live in moist woodland and evergreen forests. They eat mainly fruit.

== Range ==
It is found in Burundi, Kenya, Malawi, Mozambique, Rwanda, South Africa, Eswatini, Tanzania, Uganda, Zambia, and Zimbabwe. Their southernmost occurrence is at the Mtamvuna River on the KwaZulu-Natal-Eastern Cape border.

== Gallery ==
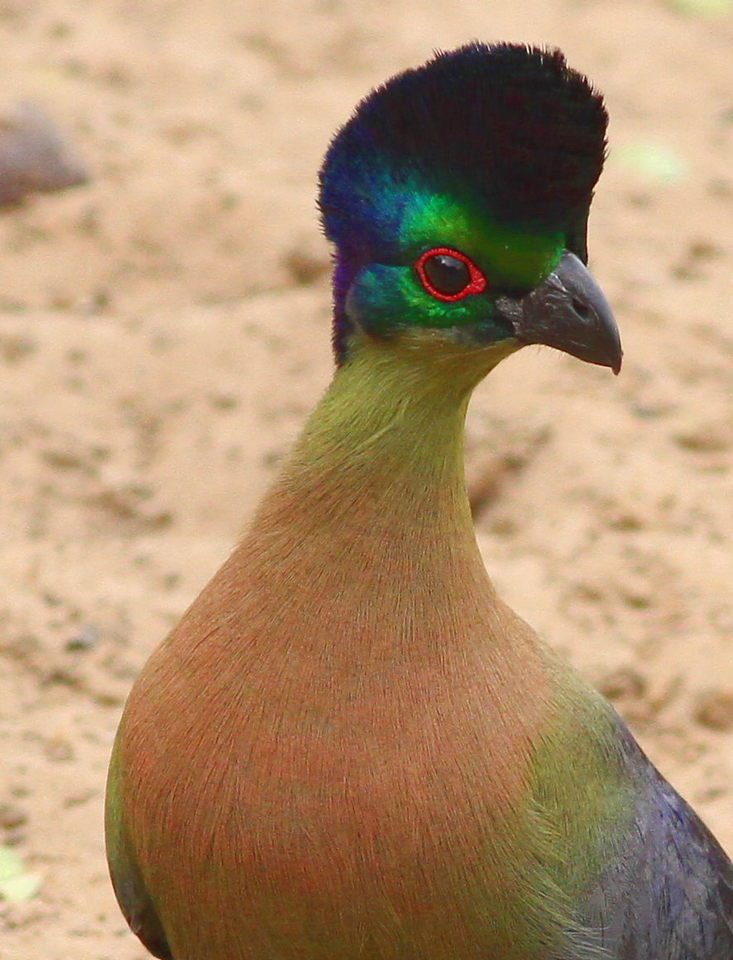
Close-up of front and head plumage

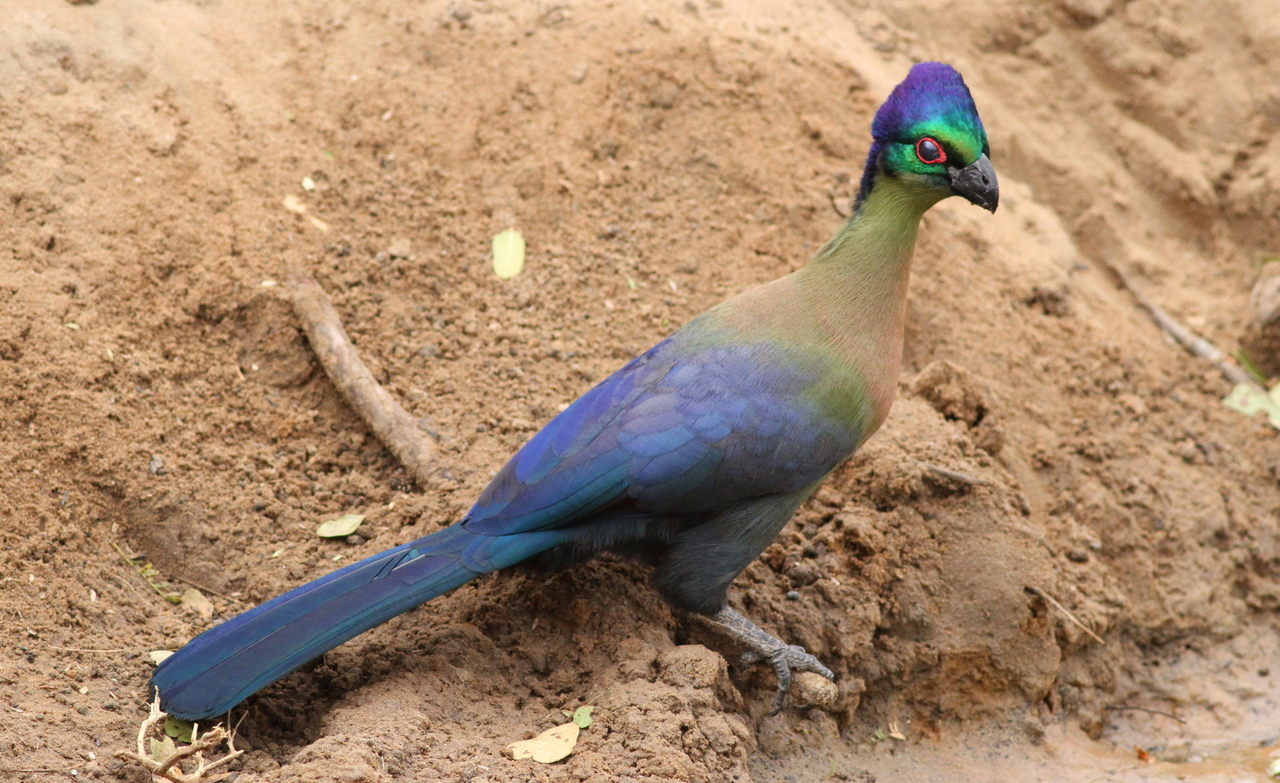
Visiting a waterhole in uMkhuze G. R.

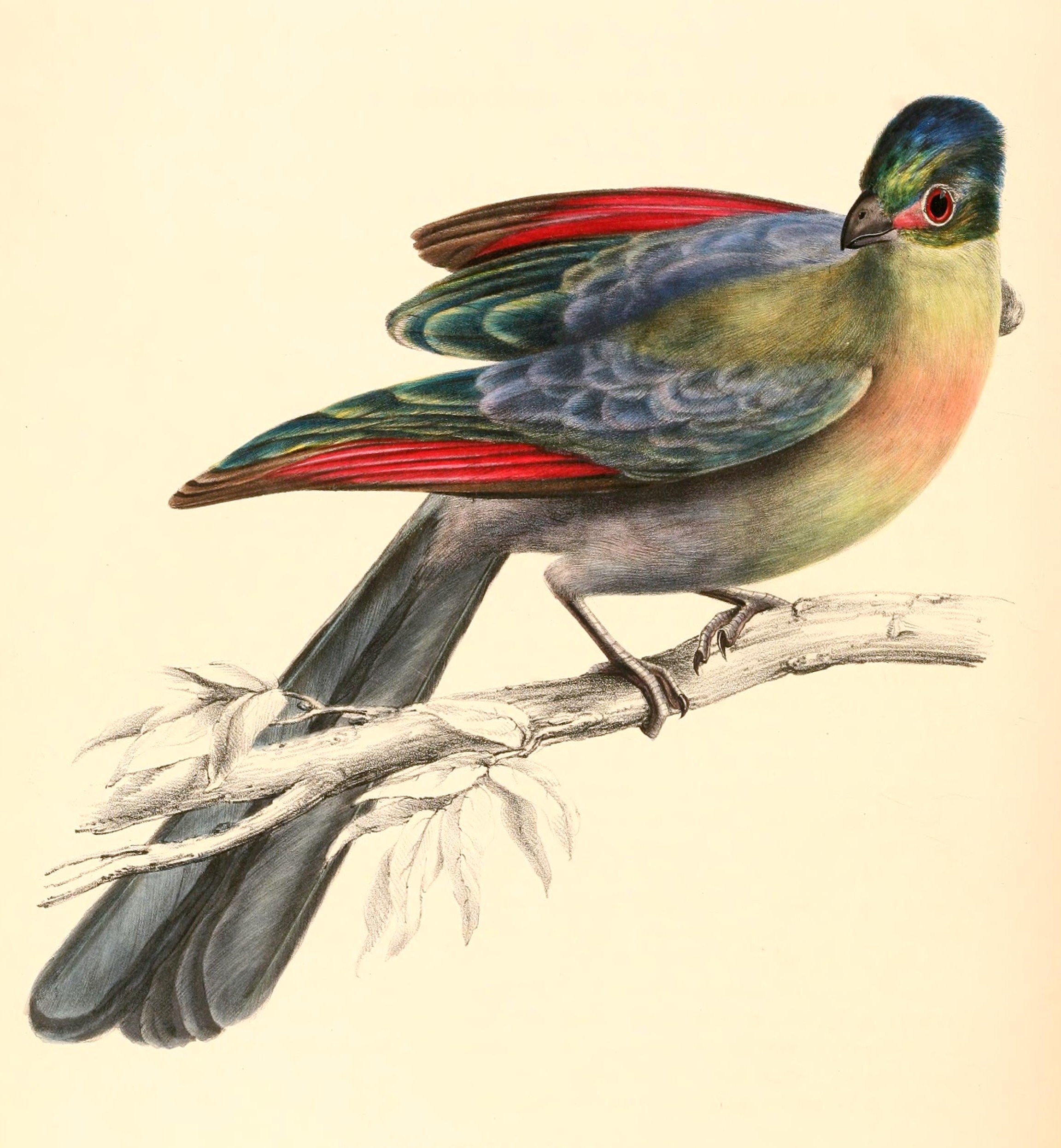
Illustration by Andrew Smith, showing crimson primaries
