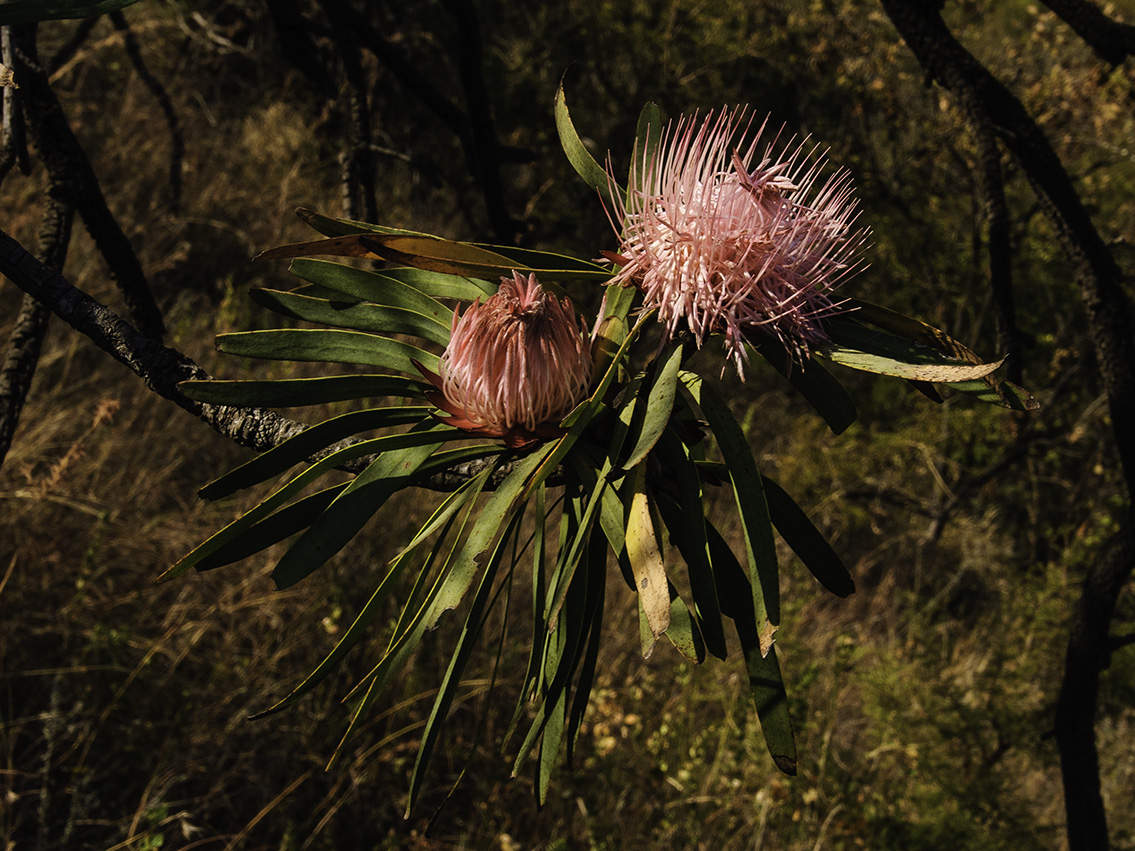

Conservation status
- Vulnerable (IUCN 3.1)

Scientific classification
- Kingdom: Plantae
- Clade: Embryophytes
- Clade: Tracheophytes
- Clade: Angiosperms
- Clade: Eudicots
- Order: Proteales
- Family: Proteaceae
- Genus: Protea
- Species: P. curvata

Binomial name
- Protea curvata N.E.Br.

= Protea curvata =

Species of flowering plant

Protea curvata (Serpentine sugarbush, Afrikaans: Serpentynsuikerbos) is a species of flowering plant in the family Proteaceae. It is endemic to Mpumalanga Province of South Africa, and it is a protected tree there.
