= Glückstadt, KwaZulu-Natal =

Glückstadt
- Location within KwaZulu-Natal Location within South Africa
- Coordinates: 27.976°S 31.031°E
- Country: South Africa
- Province: KwaZulu-Natal
- District: Zululand
- Municipality: Abaqulusi
- Time zone: UTC+2 (SAST)

Glückstadt (also Gelukstadt) is a village some 32 km south-east of Vryheid. Formed in 1906 as the centre for farming families. The name is German and means 'city of happiness'. This village was probably named after Glückstadt, a city on the Elbe River in Germany.
