= Ecotourism in South Africa =

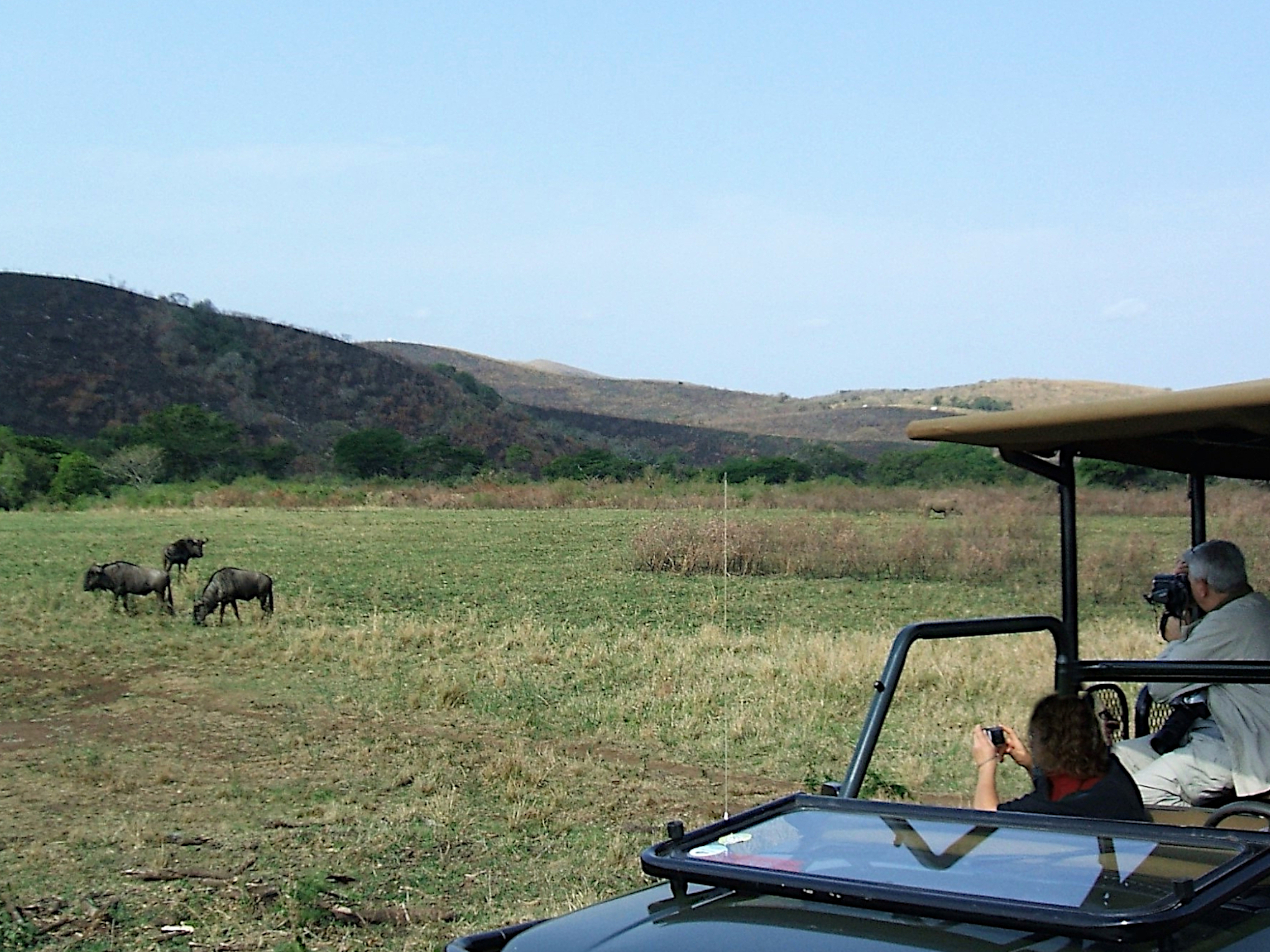
Tourists on safari in Kapama Game Reserve.

Ecotourism is the concept of responsible travel to areas that might be protected, and possibly rated as especially fragile. The intent behind ecotourism is to create as little detrimental impact on the environment as possible.

As one of the world's few megadiverse countries, South Africa has used ecotourism to sustain and improve its immense biodiversity, as well as invigorate its economy. Tourism is the fourth largest generator of foreign exchange in South Africa, and ecotourism is the idea of encouraging visitors while promoting and supporting a country's biodiversity.

South Africa contains an immense degree of biodiversity, and thus, ecotourism is a way for the country to benefit from wildlife in a non-consumptive and legal manner, as opposed to allowing illegal activities like poaching and trafficking for the international wildlife trade - things which are strictly prohibited, and actively prevented in the country.

== Regulation of Ecotourism ==
Tourism in South Africa is regulated by the Department of Tourism. The current Minister responsible for this portfolio is the social democratic GOOD party leader Patricia de Lille, who has served since March 2023.

The first real mention of green or ecotourism on a world-wide stage was in the Agenda 21 for the Travel and Tourism Industry, published in 1997 by the World Tourism Organization.

After the fall of the apartheid state and South Africa's first democratic election in 1994, the Constitution of South Africa, and later the 1997 white Paper on South African Land Policy attempted to address the racial imbalance in land ownership in the country. People who had previously been forcibly pushed off of their land were allowed to reclaim land in its stead. This new land had significant touristic potential.

In 1996, the South African Government's Department of Environmental Affairs and Tourism created a plan to develop and manage the tourism industry in a responsible and sustainable manner, "key elements" of its strategy were identified as:

- "assessment of environmental, social, and economic impacts of tourism developments;
- monitoring of tourism impacts with open disclosure of information;
- involvement of local communities in planning and decision making;
- ensuring the involvement of communities who benefit from tourism;
- maintenance and encouragement of natural, economic, social and cultural diversity;
- sustainable use of local resources;
- avoidance of waste and over-consumption."

This program, dubbed Tourism in GEAR, emphasized that tourism in the country should be led by the government, powered by the private sector, centered on community, and labour conscious.

Despite the creation of this plan, the South African government has had trouble developing systems of regulation. Some initiatives have been developed but with little follow through. Some private sector tourism companies seek international certification by organizations like Green Globe 21 or Iso 14001-based programs, but not many do this.

== Economic Effects ==
Ecotourism can be used to ensure those local to the area are involved in the experience, and are benefitting from the economic growth that comes with revenue generated. In traditional tourism models, most of the money in package tours will go to airlines, hotels, and other international countries. But with an eco hotel created for ecotourism purposes, they are more likely to hire and purchase locally thus, putting more money back into the local economy.

On the other side, ecotourism developments are frequently financed by foreign investors who are likely seeking untapped markets. There is a sense that ecotourism further commodities natural resources, and reserves.

== Biodiversity and South Africa ==
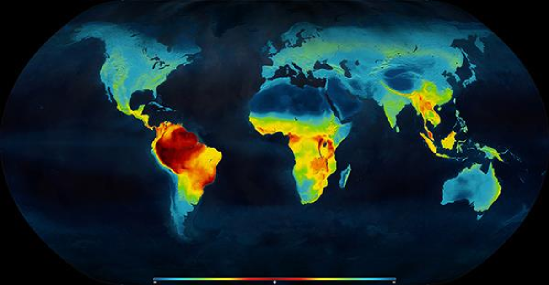
Map latitudinal gradient of biodiversity (Mannion 2014)

South Africa is extremely biodiverse, with 858 species of birds and 299 species of mammals. South Africa and seventeen other countries are considered megadiverse which means those countries contain 70% of the planet's biodiversity.

South Africa's unique geography allows the country to support such a diverse population of plants and animals. It is important to protect biodiversity in South Africa because people still rely on natural resources for food and medicine.

The Western Cape province has 8,000 plant species, and 7 out of 10 of them exist nowhere else on earth. The Cape Floral Kingdom is particularly diverse. Plants and flowers are still sometimes used as traditional forms of medicine and treatment for common ailments. Some of these plants are currently being researched for treatment of HIV patients.

Protecting the biodiversity of South Africa is important for maintaining the integrity of its ecosystems, and also protecting the health and wellbeing of South African people. Ecotourism has the capacity to promote conservation of biodiversity, and also has the capacity for disruption of wildlife and damage to the environment. The nature of these impacts varies according to the type of ecotourism activities and how the tourism operators meet the tourists' expectations.

== Conservation and South Africa ==
Some critics say that the potential benefits of ecotourism might be offset by the limited viewing preferences among tourists to protected nature reserves, meaning that most tourists are interested in seeing exciting mega-fauna that might not be as accessible.

'Fan favorites' in South Africa are the most popular species, particularly among first-time and overseas visitors, but African visitors and experienced wildlife viewers were more interested in bird and plant diversity, scenery, and rarer, less easily observed and/or less high-profile mammals.

Many of the species that were most favored by ecotourists in South African are endangered/extinction prone and thus often absent from wildlife areas due to sensitivity to human encroachment and competition with more abundant species. Hence, ecotourism may provide incentives for the conservation of intact guilds, and management for ecotourism may align more closely with biodiversity conservation.

For some endangered species, but not all, ecotourism can extend expected survival time, but calculation outcomes vary depending on population parameters and starting sizes, predation, and ecotourism scale and mechanisms. However, tourism does not currently compensate over other major conservation threats associated with natural resource extractive industries.

== Local Populations and Ecotourism in South Africa ==
Collaborative partnerships are what guide, or should guide any ecotourism efforts. Studies suggest that participation in ecotourism brings mixed results on biodiversity conservation and community livelihoods due to the involvement of multiple stakeholders in the design, planning, and implementation of ecotourism projects.
