= Louwsburg =

Louwsburg Ngoje
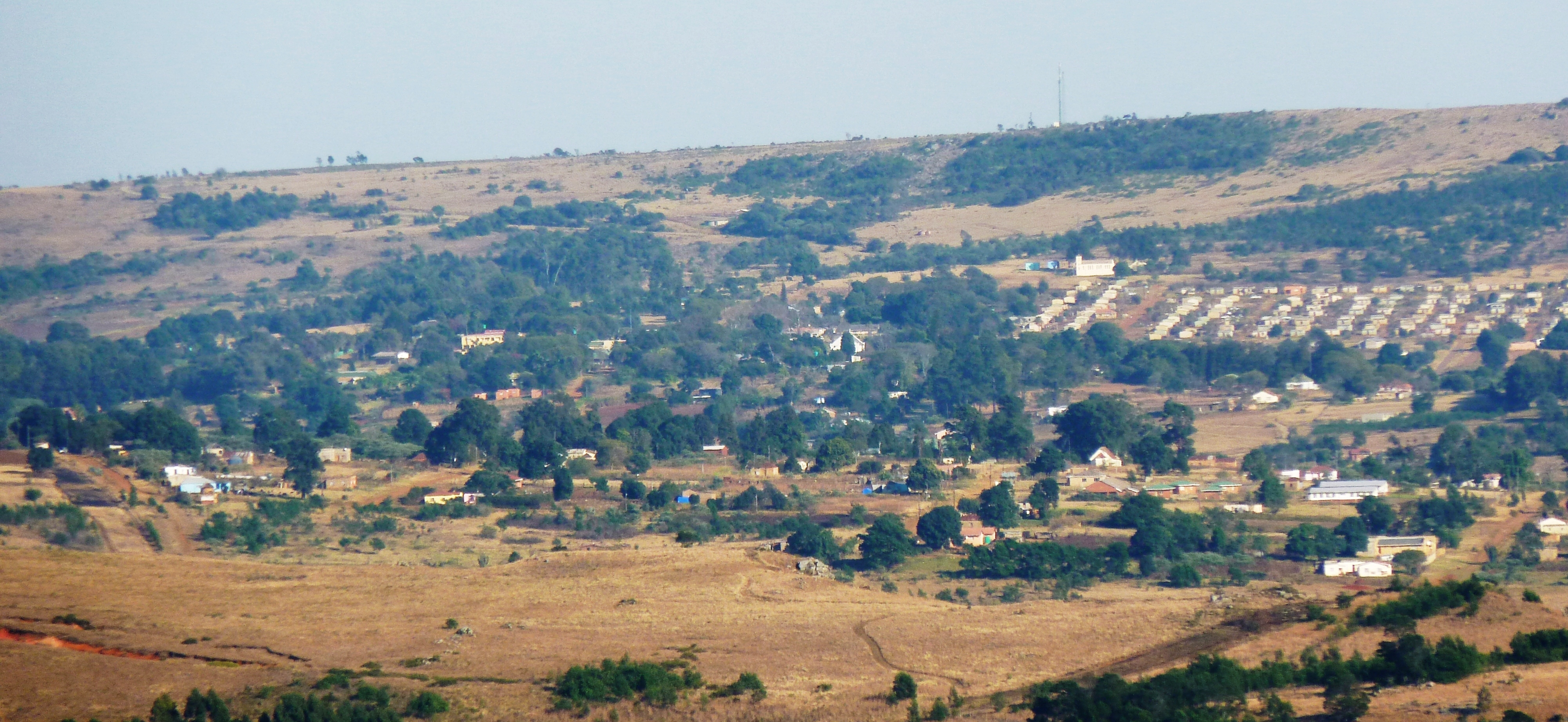

- Location within KwaZulu-Natal Location within South Africa
- Coordinates: 27°35′S 31°17′E
- Country: South Africa
- Province: KwaZulu-Natal
- District: Zululand
- Municipality: Abaqulusi
  - Councillor: (ANC)

Area
  - Total: 8.32 km^{2} (3.21 sq mi)
- Elevation: 1,290 m (4,230 ft)

Population (2011)
  - Total: 4,061
  - Density: 488/km^{2} (1,260/sq mi)

Racial makeup (2011)
  - Black African: 96.8%
  - Coloured: 0.3%
  - Indian/Asian: 0.4%
  - White: 2.2%
  - Other: 0.1%

First languages (2011)
  - Zulu: 94.4%
  - Afrikaans: 2.1%
  - English: 1.5%
  - S. Ndebele: 1.1%
  - Other: 0.9%
- Time zone: UTC+2 (SAST)
- PO box: 3150
- Area code: 034

Louwsburg is a small town in northern KwaZulu-Natal, Louwsburg was a small village named after a farmer, Louw, who donated his farm Toggevonden for establishing of the town in 1925.

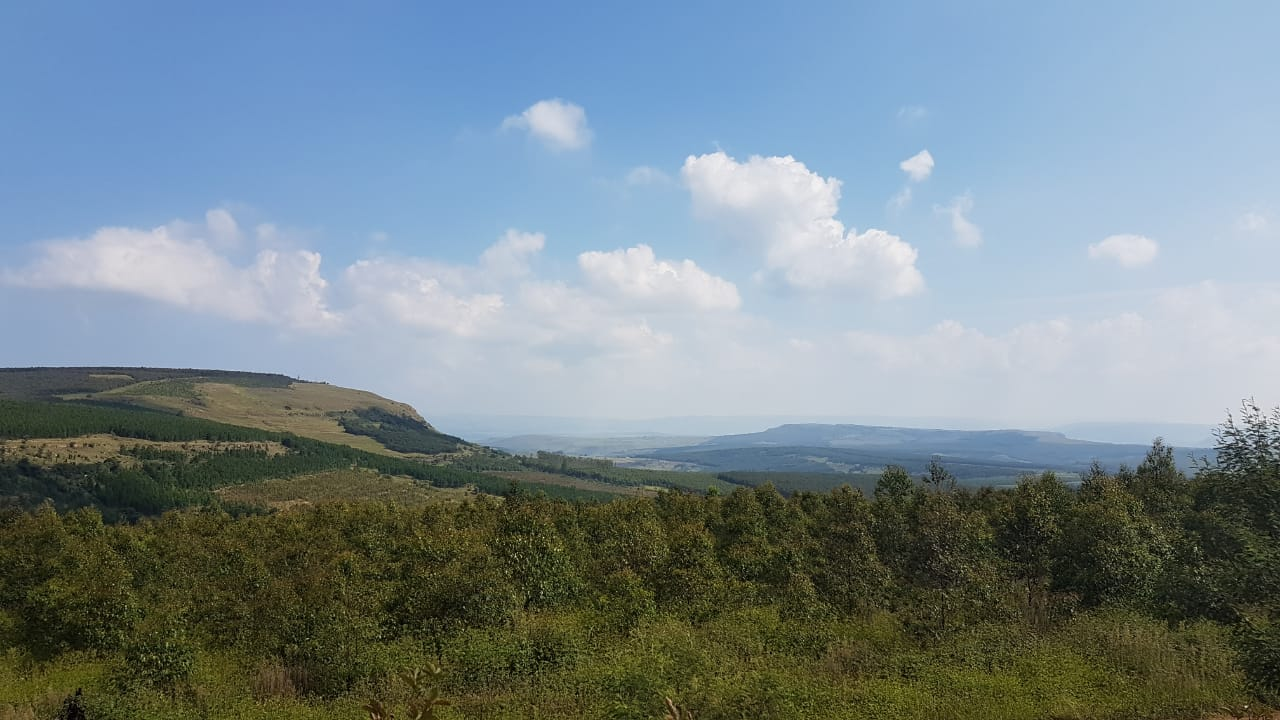
Louwsburg Mountain Overview

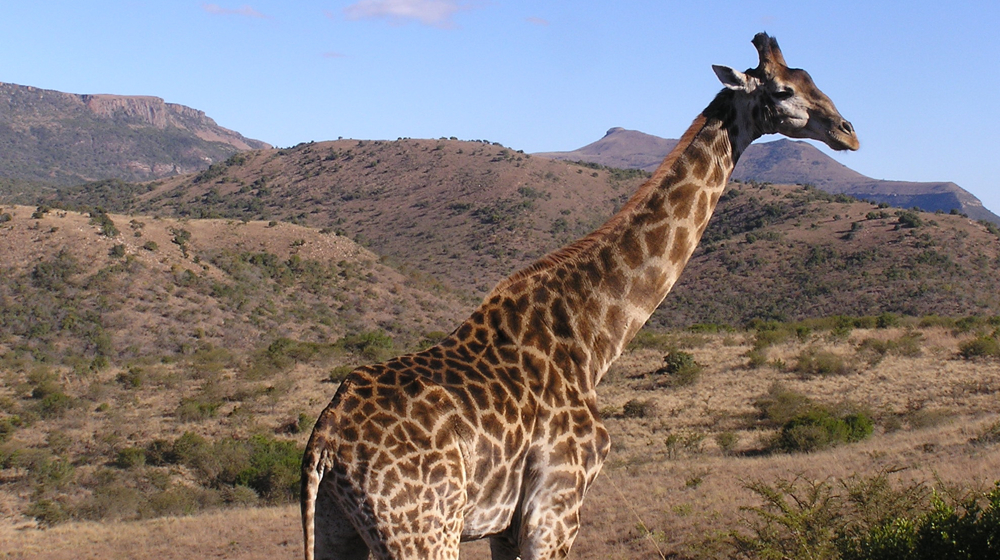
Ithala Giraffes

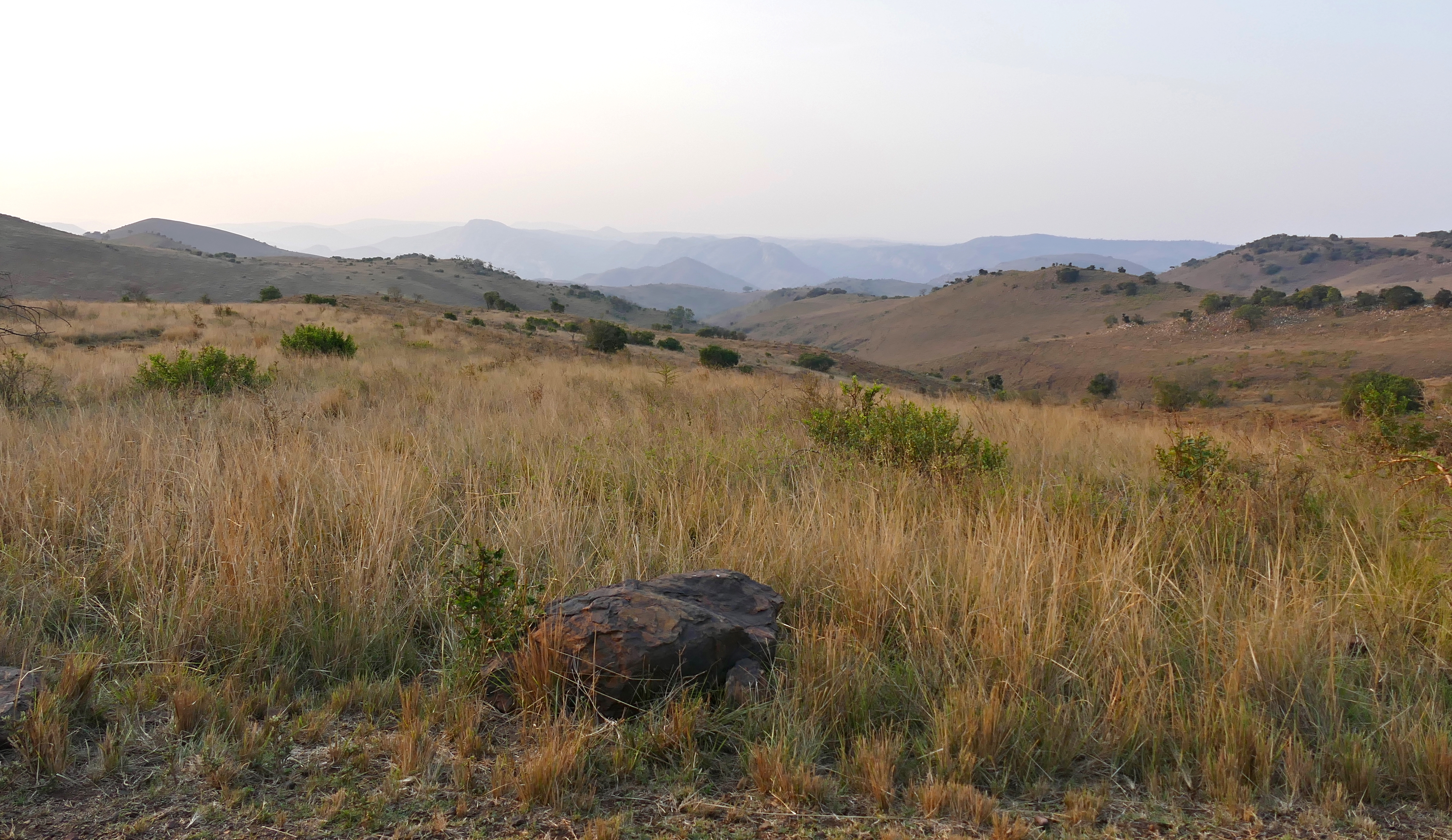
Ithala Hills

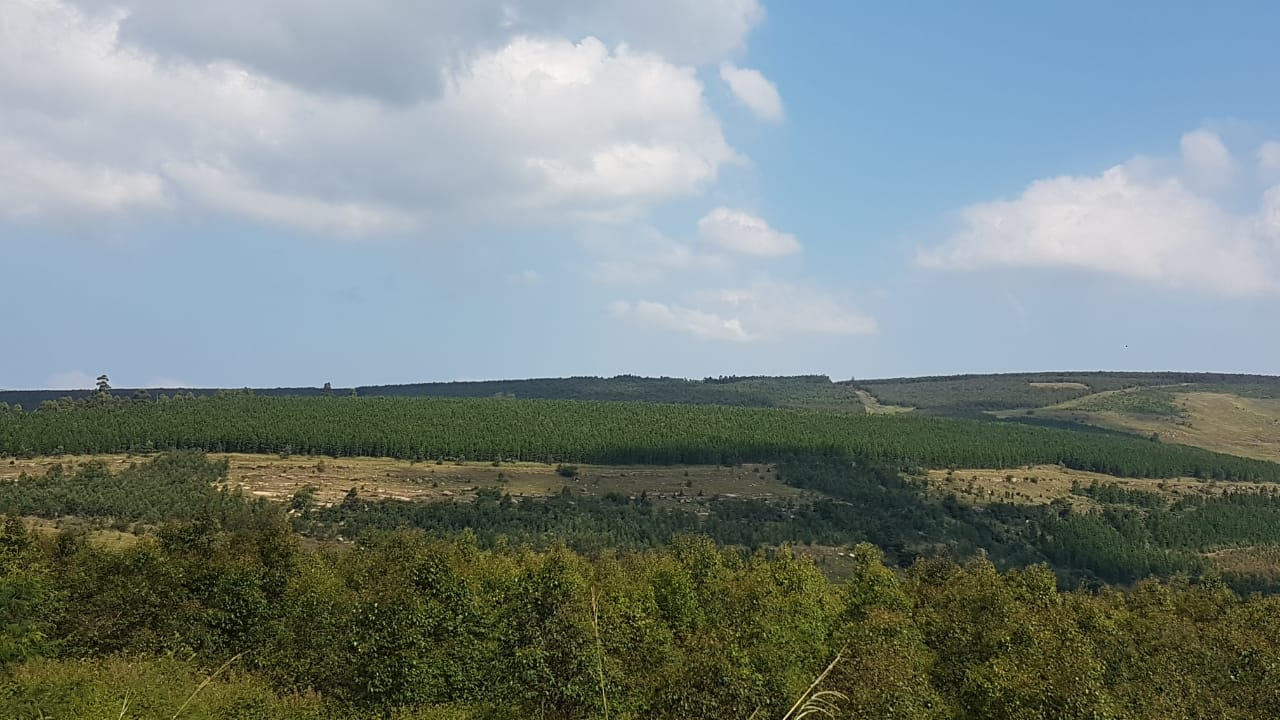
Louwsburg landscape

Cattle, Vegetable and maize farming are the primary economic activities. The town was proclaimed Louwsburg in 1920 and named after Dawid Louw, a pioneer in the area. The town's Zulu name, Ngotshe, means "cave", though its location is hidden by old towns People. The town is set in a broader region designated as eNgotshe. The town's main tourist attraction is the adjacent Itala Game Reserve.

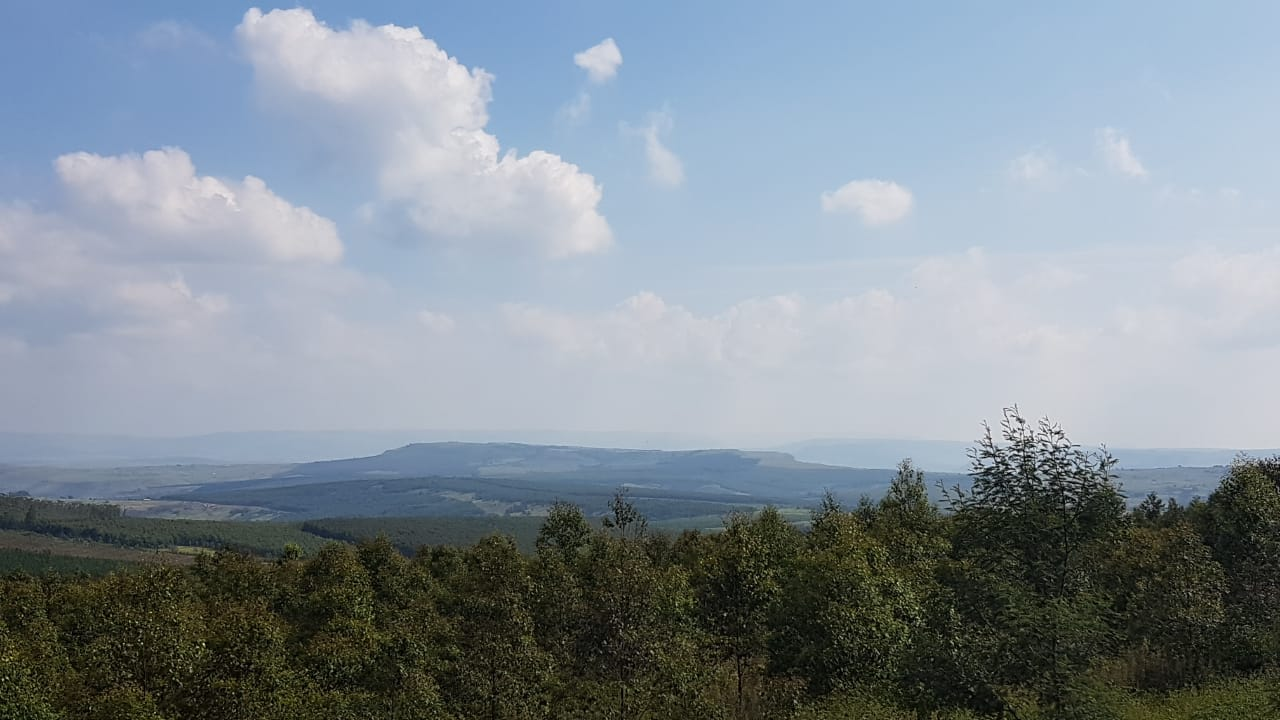
Louwsburg landscapes

== Origin ==
Dawid Louw (1850-1927) was a member of Lucas Meijer's boer commando, which in 1884, reacted to Dinuzulu's plea for help against his uncle Zibhebhu, who was usurping the throne. In return for their overthrow of Usibepu, they were granted land in northern Zululand, the future Nieuwe Republiek. Upon the commando's return from the campaign, Louw was given a farm by the king, and decided to build his farm house on the eastern slope of Louw's Mountain. Here he had the benefit of easy access to water and labour, and named his farm Toggevonden. Louwsburg is also known to have many caves and is also home to an old settlers grave yard situated at GPS Coordinates -27.568623, 31.293766.

== Demographics and development ==
Louwsburg is situated near Vryheid. The majority of people living in this area are Zulus, but a fair number of white South Africans and other groups also live here. Louwsburg continues to grow annually, though slowly. Residents blame the town council for being ineffective and unfair.

The town has one major secondary school named Ngotshe Secondary School and two primary schools of which one is within the town limits. There are several schools outside the town limits. Living conditions in the area are reasonable. Most people are living in the middle-class conditions and live in harmony. There are however reports of escalating youth drinking and AIDS, which is under observation. The town has been visited by several well-known politicians, including chief Mangosuthu Buthelezi and President Jacob Zuma.

Emalia decided to improve the lives local residents by starting a nursing college called Nandisa training institute. The courses include HIV, first aid, ancillary, auxiliary, nutrition, and others.

== Environment ==
An area northwest of Louwsburg is characterized by rugged, impenetrable ravines, and is known as "Duiwel se Wêreld" (Afrikaans: Devil's terrain). According to Afrikaner legend, it was the work of the devil, who finding it inferior to God's creation, tore it asunder.

== Gallery ==
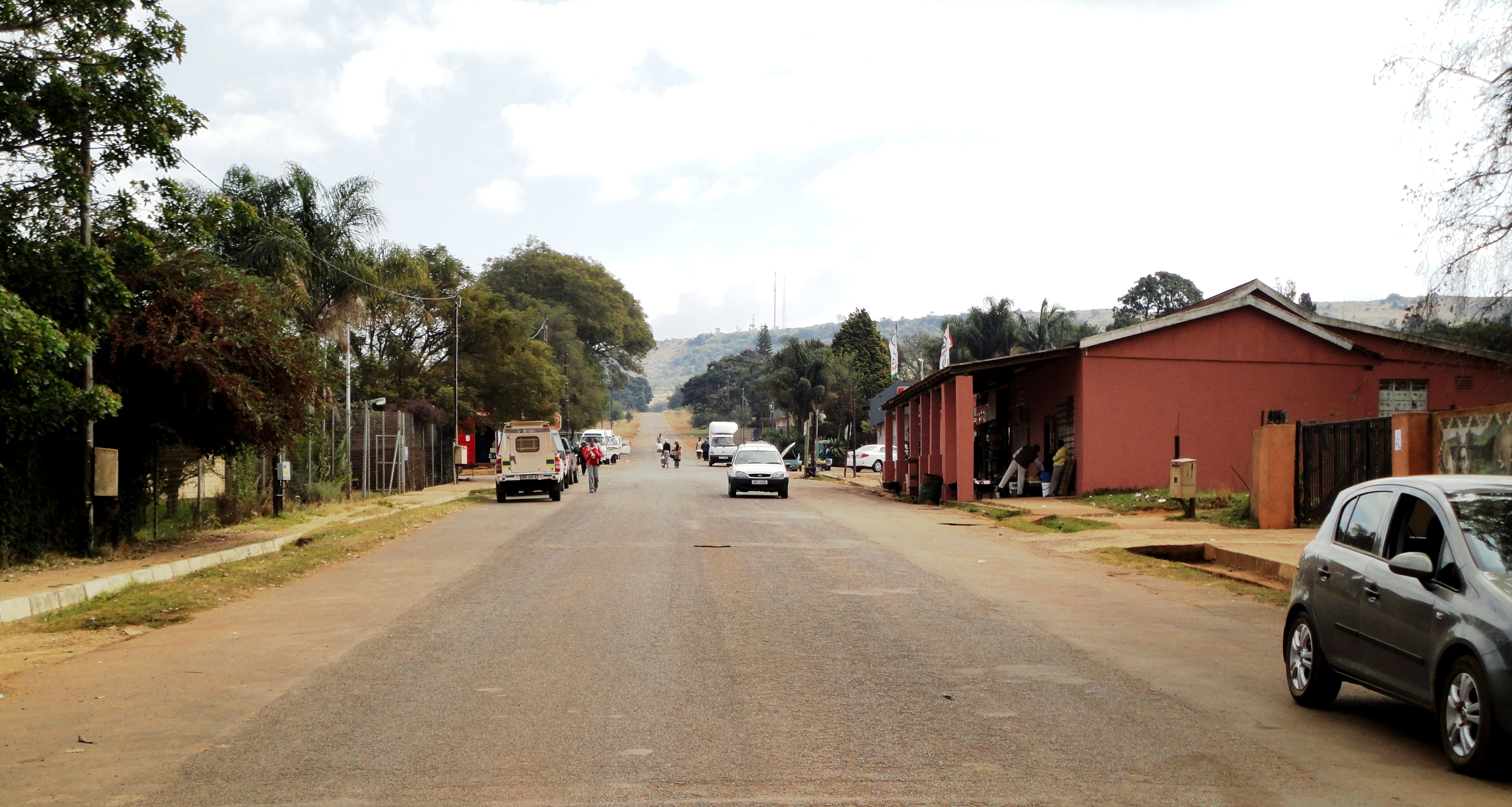
Avenue Street

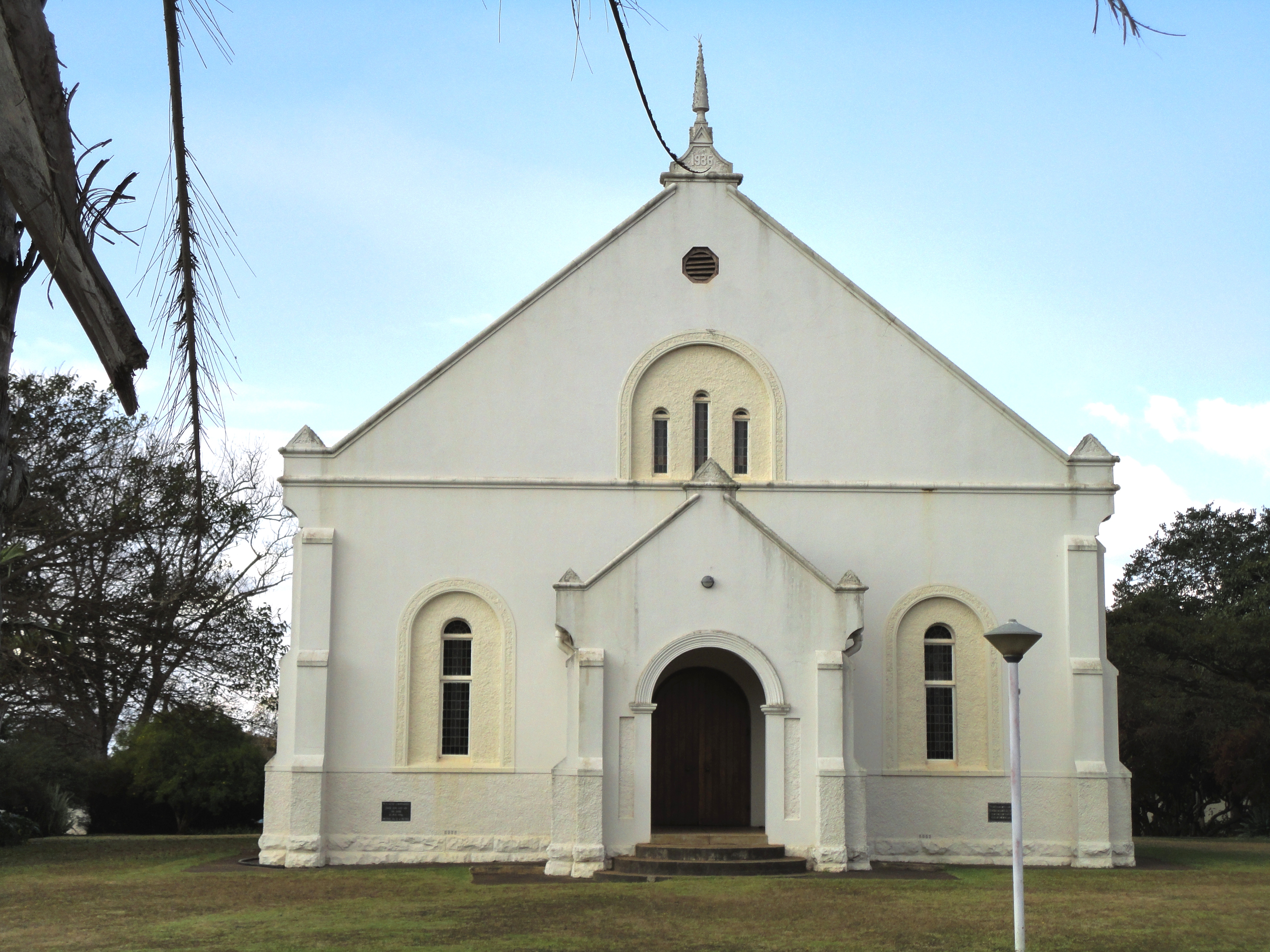
The NG church building

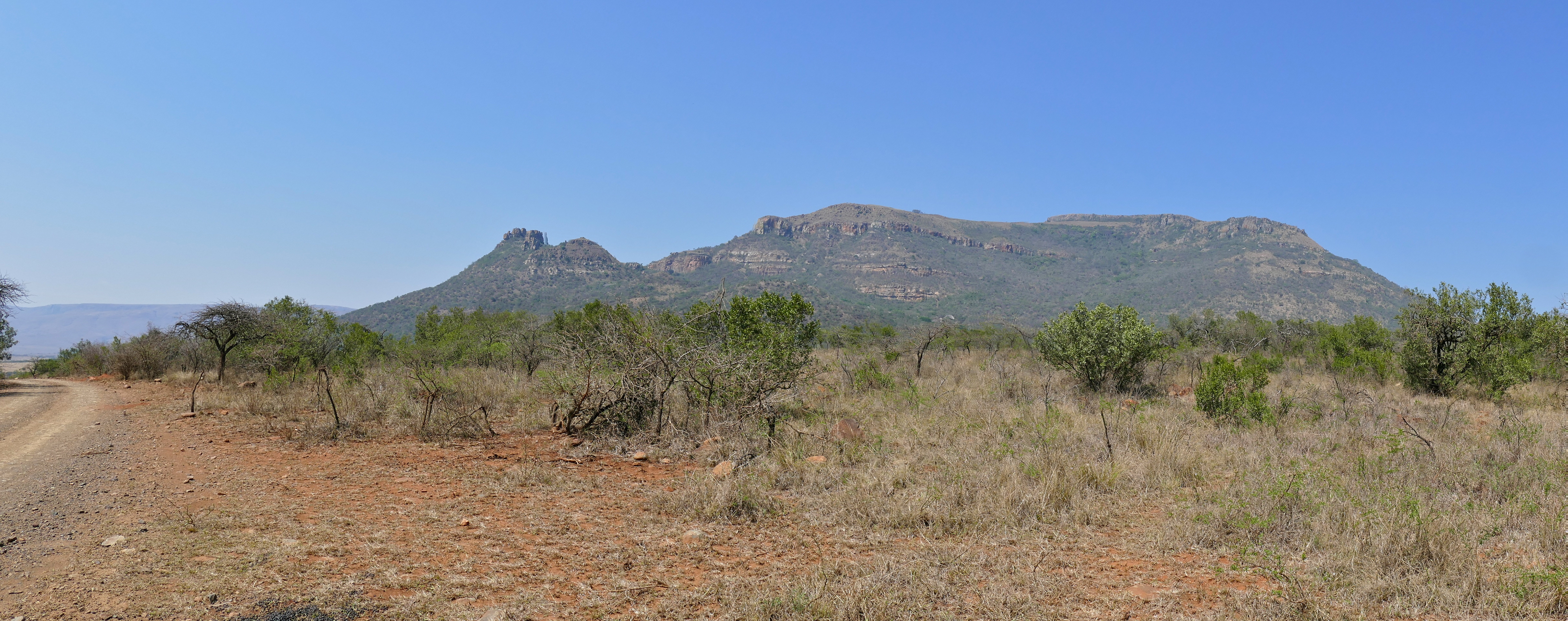
Ngotshe mountain seen from the Ithala G. R.
