= Ithala Game Reserve =

Game reserve in KwaZulu-Natal, South Africa

- IUCN category IV (habitat/species management area)
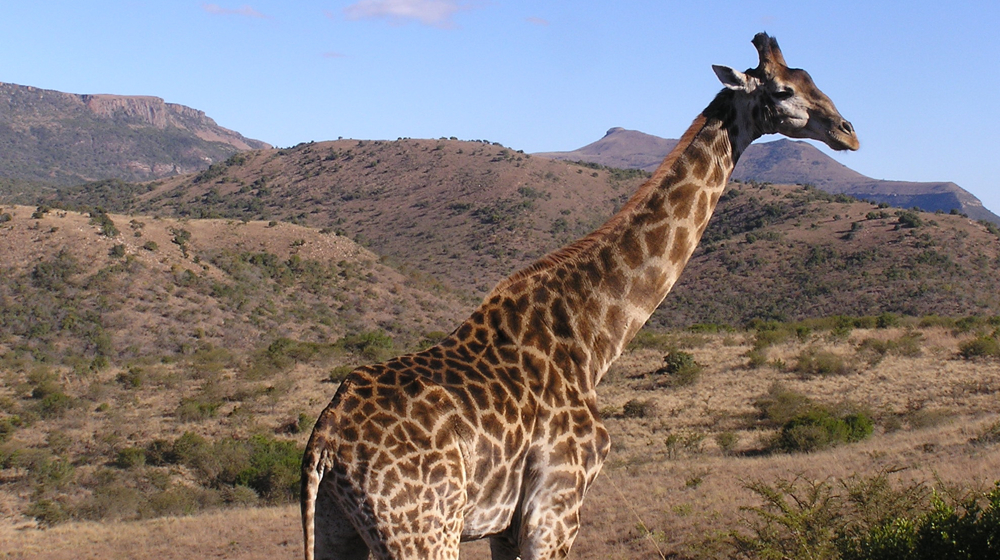
- Giraffe amid mountainous terrain in Ithala

- Location within South Africa
- Location: KwaZulu-Natal, South Africa
- Nearest city: Louwsburg, Vryheid
- Coordinates: 27°30′57″S 31°19′53″E
- Area: 296.53 km^{2} (114.49 sq mi)
- Established: 1973
- Governing body: Ezemvelo KZN Wildlife
- Website: www.kznwildlife.com

Ithala Game Reserve is a protected area located in northern KwaZulu-Natal, South Africa, approximately 400 kilometres (250 mi) north of Durban and 70 kilometres (43 mi) east of Vryheid. Encompassing 296.53 square kilometres (114.49 sq mi), the reserve is characterised by exceptionally rugged terrain, descending from the Ngotshe Mountains at 1,450 metres (4,760 ft) elevation to the Pongola River valley at 400 metres (1,300 ft). The name Ithala derives from the isiZulu word meaning "the shelf", referring to the distinctive flat-topped mountain ridges within the reserve.

The reserve is notable for its exceptional geological diversity, containing some of the oldest exposed rock formations in the world, dating to approximately 3 billion years ago on the Kaapvaal Craton. Ithala supports over 80 mammal species, more than 300 bird species, and approximately 910 plant species across 13 distinct vegetation communities. The reserve is designated as an Important Bird Area and is the only location in KwaZulu-Natal where the vulnerable saddleback sugarbush (Protea comptonii) occurs.

== Geography and climate ==
Ithala Game Reserve is situated on the southern bank of the Pongola River in the transitional zone between the Grassland Biome and Savanna Biome of South Africa. The reserve's topography is dominated by the Ngotshe Mountain escarpment to the south and the deeply incised valleys of the Pongola River system to the north. Several rivers rise within or near the reserve, including the Ngubhu, Mbizo, Thalu and Bivane, all flowing northward to join the Pongola River, which forms the northern boundary.

The extreme altitudinal range of over 1,000 metres (3,300 ft) creates a remarkable diversity of habitats, from densely vegetated riverine valleys and lowveld thornveld at lower elevations, through open savanna and woodland, to high-lying sourveld grassland plateaus, mountain ridges and dramatic cliff faces at higher altitudes. The terrain is characterised by jagged dolerite spires, horizontal bands of pink and russet sandstone, and rolling hills covered in mountain grassland.

Ithala experiences a warm climate with distinct wet and dry seasons. The rainy season extends from October to April, with annual precipitation ranging from approximately 680 mm (27 in) in the eastern valleys to 900 mm (35 in) in the west, and up to 1,200 mm (47 in) on the high-altitude plateau. The dry winter months from May to September are characterised by warm days and cold nights, with frost occurring at higher elevations.

== Geology ==
The geology of Ithala Game Reserve is exceptionally diverse and includes some of the oldest exposed rocks on Earth. The reserve lies on the southeastern margin of the Kaapvaal Craton, one of only two remaining areas of pristine Archaean crust (3.6–2.5 billion years old) on the planet, the other being the Pilbara Craton of Western Australia.

The reserve's rock formations include granite, gneiss, quartzite, ironstone shale, dolomite, and extensive sandstone deposits, creating the diverse soils that support the reserve's exceptional biodiversity. The banded ironstone formations within the reserve were historically exploited for iron ore smelting by Iron Age inhabitants. The dramatic cliffs of the Ngotshe Mountains, visible from Ntshondwe Camp, display colourful horizontal bands of sandstone interspersed with vertical spires of dark dolerite rock.

== History ==
=== Prehistoric and early human occupation ===
Archaeological evidence indicates human occupation of the Ithala area spanning hundreds of thousands of years. Middle Stone Age tools discovered by archaeologists date back approximately 200,000 years, while numerous sites scattered throughout the reserve contain Later Stone Age spear and axe heads dating to around 20,000 years ago. San hunter-gatherers inhabited the region, leaving rock art in shelters in the eastern part of the reserve.

With the arrival of Nguni-speaking peoples in more recent centuries, Iron Age technology came to the area. Iron smelting operations were established adjacent to the banded ironstone deposits, which were crushed to provide iron ore. Wild olive wood was used as fuel in clay furnaces to produce iron tools for agriculture and weapons, primarily spear tips (assegais).

The region witnessed significant events during the era of the Zulu Kingdom, including the reign of Shaka and successive Zulu kings. The caves along the cliff faces of Ithala provided refuge for people fleeing conflicts during the Zulu wars, and traces of this occupation can still be found.

=== Colonial period and the Nieuwe Republiek ===
Prior to European colonisation, the Ithala area bordered the original Pongola Game Reserve, proclaimed in 1894 by President Paul Kruger of the South African Republic (Transvaal), one of the earliest formally protected areas established by a government in Africa.

Following the Anglo-Zulu War of 1879, the area experienced political turmoil as various chiefs competed for supremacy. In 1884, Boer farmers from the Utrecht and Wakkerstroom districts allied with Dinuzulu kaCetshwayo, heir to the Zulu throne, offering military support in exchange for land. After helping Dinuzulu defeat his rival Zibhebhu kaMapitha at the Battle of Tshaneni on 5 June 1884, the Boers were granted approximately 1,355,000 morgen (over 1,100,000 ha (11,000 km^{2})) of territory in northern Zululand.

On 5 August 1884, the Nieuwe Republiek (New Republic) was formally established with Vryheid as its capital, gaining recognition from Germany, Portugal, and the South African Republic. The Ithala area fell within this territory. Under white ownership, most of the land continued to be occupied by Zulu families as labour or tenant farms, with only five dwellings built by white settlers on the farms Doornkraal, Doornpan, Potwe Halt, Langverwacht and Craig Adam.

Game was abundant before European settlement, but intense hunting by settlers severely depleted wildlife populations. The rinderpest epidemic of 1896 further devastated both domestic livestock and wild ungulates throughout the region.

=== Gold mining ===
Gold was discovered in the Ithala area in the early 1900s. The Wonder Mine on the farm Wonderfontein near the Pongola River began development in 1905 and was sporadically mined with limited success from 1910 until 1933, producing a total of 147 kg of gold. Approximately 3 km southeast of Wonder Mine, on the farm Vergelegen, additional reefs were discovered in 1911. The Vergelegen Mine opened in 1913, was renamed the Eureka Mine in 1914, and produced 129 kg of gold by 1915 when it closed. It reopened as the Ngotshe Mine in 1943 and operated intermittently until 1967, yielding only 8.3 kg of gold. Both mine sites are now abandoned and lie within the reserve.

=== Anti-nagana campaign ===
From 1919 to the early 1950s, the anti-nagana campaign was waged against the tsetse fly, which carried trypanosomiasis (sleeping sickness in humans and nagana in cattle). Following research by Surgeon-Major Sir David Bruce, who identified the tsetse fly as the disease vector in 1894, colonial authorities implemented drastic measures to control the flies, believing that eliminating wild game would remove their breeding habitat and blood source. Thousands of animals were shot throughout Zululand, contributing to the local extinction of many species in the Ithala area.

=== Establishment of the game reserve ===
By the time the Natal Parks Board (now Ezemvelo KZN Wildlife) began purchasing farms in the area in 1973, soil erosion and overgrazing by livestock were widespread. Very little game remained, with 25 mammal species having become locally extinct. The reserve was formally proclaimed in 1973, initially covering approximately 8,000 hectares. Conservationists recognised the area's importance due to its dramatic variety of habitats and began an extensive programme of land reclamation and wildlife reintroduction.

Using historical records from the neighbouring original Pongola Game Reserve, conservationists determined which species had formerly occurred in the area and systematically reintroduced them. By 1982, Ithala had been expanded to nearly 30,000 hectares through the acquisition of additional farmland. A total of 23 mammal species have been reintroduced, including white rhinoceros, black rhinoceros, African buffalo, kudu, tsessebe, red hartebeest, eland, giraffe, leopard, cheetah, brown hyena, and most recently a small herd of African elephants introduced in 1990, which has since become a well-established breeding herd.

== Flora ==
Ithala Game Reserve supports approximately 910 plant species across 13 distinct vegetation communities, reflecting the exceptional diversity created by the reserve's complex topography, varied geology, and wide altitudinal range. Major vegetation types represented within the reserve include Ithala Quartzite Sourveld, Northern Zululand Mistbelt Grassland, and various savanna and woodland communities.

The vegetation ranges from wetland and marsh communities along streams, through riverine thicket and forest, dense bushveld and thornveld, to open savanna and high-lying sourveld grassland on the plateaus. An impressive 320 tree species have been documented in the reserve. Characteristic trees include various Acacia species in the thornveld, wild fig (Ficus spp.), cabbage tree (Cussonia spp.), candelabra tree (Euphorbia ingens), and dense riverine forest along watercourses.

=== Rare and endemic plants ===
Ithala is particularly notable as the only location in KwaZulu-Natal where the saddleback sugarbush (Protea comptonii) occurs. This vulnerable tree species, assessed as Vulnerable (C1+2a(i)) by the South African National Biodiversity Institute in 2019, has a fragmented distribution with isolated populations in the mountains south of Barberton in Mpumalanga, adjacent areas in Eswatini, and the Ithala region. The Ithala population comprises approximately 1,100 mature individuals divided among five to eight small subpopulations of 30–180 plants each. These numbers are monitored, and the population shows continuing decline due to browsing by wild antelope and too frequent fires (biennial burns).

Other rare and localised plants found in Ithala include Searsia pondoensis (formerly Rhus pondoensis), pepper-bark tree (Warburgia salutaris), Gonioma kamassi, Syzygium legattii, Aloe vryheidensis, Cyrtanthus brachysiphon, Dracosciadium italae, Melanospermum italae, Gladiolus cataractum and Gladiolus microcarpus subsp. italaensis.

== Fauna ==
=== Mammals ===
Ithala Game Reserve supports approximately 80 mammal species. Four of the Big Five are present: African elephant, African buffalo, leopard, and both white and black rhinoceros. Lions have not been reintroduced, which results in a notably relaxed atmosphere among prey species and excellent game viewing opportunities.

The South African giraffe is particularly abundant and has become an icon of the reserve. Ithala is the only location in KwaZulu-Natal supporting herds of tsessebe, the fastest-running antelope in Africa. Other grazers include impala, red hartebeest, blue wildebeest, eland, reedbuck, mountain reedbuck, zebra, and warthog. Browsers present in the reserve include common duiker, bushbuck, nyala, and greater kudu.

Research has documented that most grazing species in Ithala (with the exception of reedbuck) produce young seasonally around November to December when ample green forage is available, while browsers deliver young throughout the year.

Predators include leopard, brown hyena, spotted hyena (rarely seen), cheetah, serval, and African wildcat. Rare and endangered mammals present include greater bushbaby, honey badger, pangolin, and the oribi. The rock hyrax (dassie) is abundant around Ntshondwe Camp, where their distinctive barking calls are a common feature.

=== Birds ===
Ithala Game Reserve is designated as an Important Bird Area (IBA) by BirdLife International, supporting over 300 bird species. This exceptional diversity is attributed to the reserve's ecotonal nature at the transition between grassland and savanna biomes, and the variety of habitats from riverine forest to montane grassland and cliff faces.

Globally threatened species breeding in the reserve include the blue crane (Anthropoides paradiseus), with up to three pairs breeding annually, and the southern bald ibis (Geronticus calvus), which maintains a breeding colony of 20–100 birds on the mountainous cliffs. The breeding season for southern bald ibis is from July to October.

Large raptors that are rare outside extensive protected areas but occur at Ithala include the white-backed vulture (Gyps africanus), lappet-faced vulture (Torgos tracheliotos), martial eagle (Polemaetus bellicosus), bateleur (Terathopius ecaudatus), crowned eagle (Stephanoaetus coronatus), tawny eagle (Aquila rapax), and secretarybird (Sagittarius serpentarius). Verreaux's eagle, South Africa's largest eagle, is commonly seen soaring over the cliffs above Ntshondwe Camp.

Regionally threatened species include the African grass owl (Tyto capensis) in the grassland areas, lanner falcon (Falco biarmicus), and half-collared kingfisher (Alcedo semitorquata) in the riverine forest.

The red-billed oxpecker (Buphagus erythrorhynchus), which had become locally extinct due to the use of arsenical cattle dips during the anti-nagana campaigns and subsequent agricultural practices, was successfully reintroduced from Kruger National Park around 1994, when 175 birds were released. The species has since re-established a breeding population.

Other notable birds include the purple-crested turaco, brown-headed parrot, broad-billed roller, bearded woodpecker, mocking cliff chat, white-throated robin-chat, Natal spurfowl, gorgeous bush-shrike, Temminck's courser, magpie shrike, grey go-away bird, and Denham's bustard.

=== Reptiles and amphibians ===
The reserve supports 18 amphibian and 15 reptile species. Endangered reptiles include the African rock python (Python sebae natalensis) and Nile crocodile (Crocodylus niloticus). South African endemic reptiles and amphibians found in the reserve include the raucous toad (Sclerophrys capensis), Natal hinged tortoise (Kinixys natalensis), common slug-eater (Duberria lutrix), cross-marked grass snake (Psammophis crucifer), northern spiny agama (Agama aculeata distanti), Transvaal girdled lizard (Cordylus vittifer), Barberton girdled lizard (Cordylus warreni barbertonensis), Natal flat lizard (Platysaurus intermedius natalensis), spotted thick-toed gecko (Pachydactylus maculatus), and Van Son's gecko (Pachydactylus vansoni), the latter being a KwaZulu-Natal endemic.

=== Invertebrates ===
Endemic butterflies recorded in the reserve include Swanepoel's copper (Aloeides swanepoeli), yellow Zulu (Alaena amazoula), and the sapphire (Iolaus silas).

== Conservation ==
Ithala Game Reserve is owned by the State and administered by Ezemvelo KZN Wildlife. The main conservation challenges facing the reserve include:

- Invasive alien plants: Control of invasive non-native plant species is a major ongoing management concern. Re-infestation from the unconserved north bank of the Pongola River complicates control efforts.
- Soil erosion: Historic overgrazing and cultivation on slopes left extensive erosion, though rehabilitation programmes have made significant progress.
- Fire management: Inappropriate fire regimes, including too-frequent burns, threaten sensitive species such as Protea comptonii.
- Browsing pressure: High densities of reintroduced browsers have caused decline in some sensitive plant species, including the saddleback sugarbush.

The reserve has successfully recovered from the severe degradation present at the time of proclamation. Areas that were previously farmland are recovering from overgrazing and erosion, though most of the reserve was only minimally modified before proclamation and retains exceptional natural diversity.

== Tourism and facilities ==
Ithala offers a range of accommodation and activities within a malaria-free environment.

=== Accommodation ===
Ntshondwe Camp is the reserve's main camp, situated on a plateau at the foot of the Ngotshe Mountain cliffs. The camp is ingeniously camouflaged against the mountain and is virtually invisible until arrival. Winner of three consecutive AA Travel Guides & SAA Resort of the Year awards, the camp features 39 thatched self-catering chalets (accommodating 2–6 guests each) and 28 twin-bedded non-catering chalets set among indigenous acacias, wild figs, cabbage trees and massive boulders. Facilities include a restaurant, bar, conference centre, curio shop selling locally-made traditional crafts, and a swimming pool built around a giant boulder that tumbled from the cliffs above.

Ntshondwe Lodge is an exclusive three-bedroom luxury lodge located below the cliffs overlooking Ntshondwe valley, with its own pool, sundeck and braai area.

Three rustic bush camps offer more secluded experiences:

- Mhlangeni Bush Camp: Set on a rocky outcrop with excellent views, accommodating up to 10 guests
- Mbizo Bush Camp: Situated beside rapids and pools where the Ngubhu and Mbizo rivers meet, accommodating 8 guests in two units
- Thalu Bush Camp: Located on the banks of the Thalu River, accommodating 4 guests

Doornkraal Campsite offers basic camping facilities (no electricity) in an unfenced setting near a river where swimming is permitted.

=== Activities ===
- Self-drive game viewing: An extensive network of roads, mostly gravel but well-maintained for sedan vehicles, allows self-guided exploration. A notated guide booklet is available from the Ntshondwe shop.
- Guided game drives: Day and night drives in open vehicles are offered from Ntshondwe Camp.
- Walking trails: Self-guided trails depart from Ntshondwe Camp, offering panoramic views—a rare privilege in Big Five reserves. Guided walks with armed rangers are also available.
- 4x4 trails: Including the Bivane 4x4 Trail traversing remote sections to the confluence of the Bivane and Pongola rivers.
- Mountain biking: Guided mountain bike safaris are available (guests must provide their own bicycles).
- Bird watching: Excellent throughout the reserve, with the best time for migratory species being November to April.
- Swimming: The rivers within the reserve are free of bilharzia and crocodiles (in most sections), and swimming is permitted at Thalu and Mbizo camps.

The reserve has an airstrip (1,200 m tarred runway) suitable for light to medium twin-engine aircraft.

== See also ==
- Ezemvelo KZN Wildlife
- Hluhluwe–iMfolozi Park
- Pongola Game Reserve
- Kaapvaal Craton
- Nieuwe Republiek
