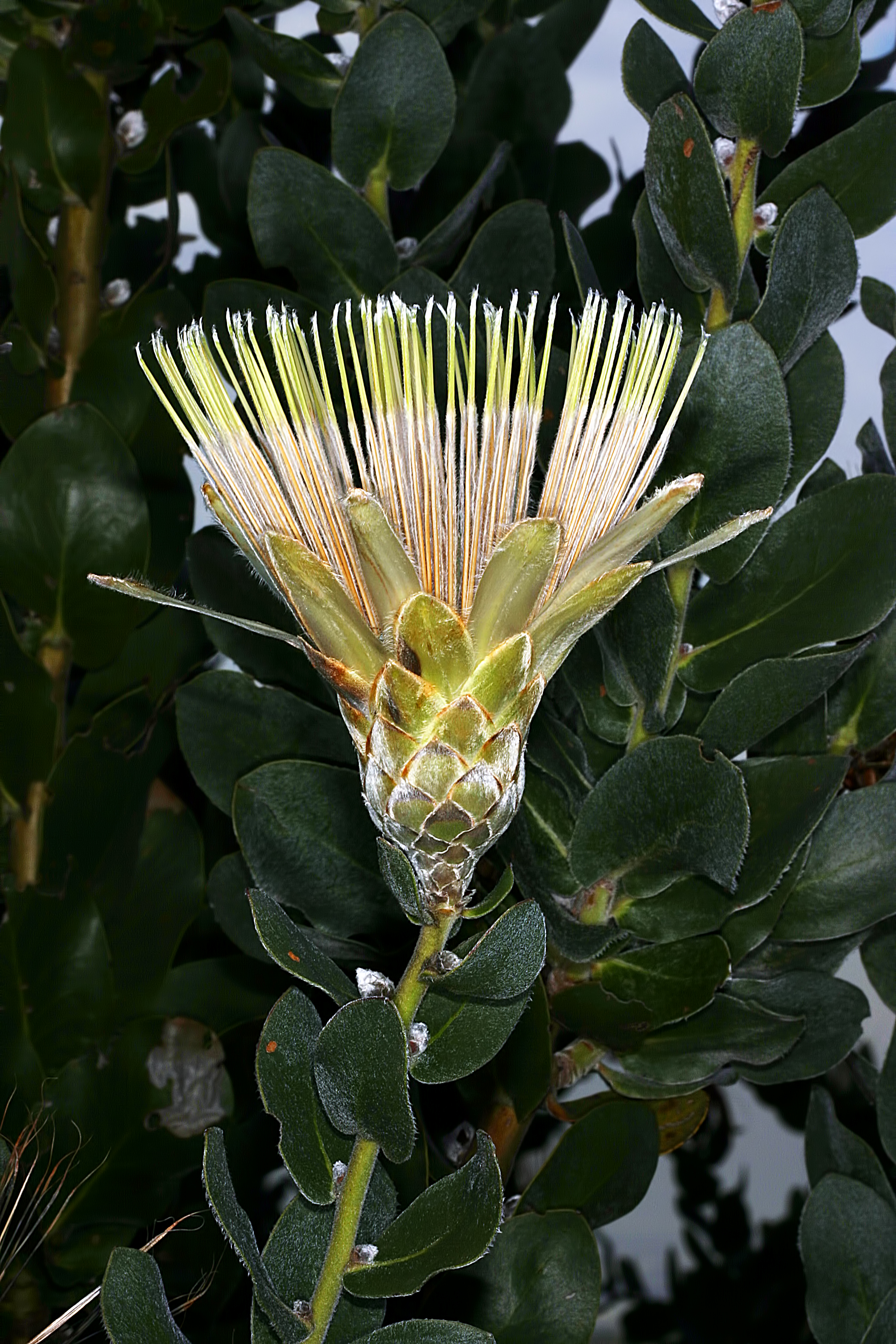

Conservation status
- Near Threatened (IUCN 3.1)

Scientific classification
- Kingdom: Plantae
- Clade: Embryophytes
- Clade: Tracheophytes
- Clade: Spermatophytes
- Clade: Angiosperms
- Clade: Eudicots
- Order: Proteales
- Family: Proteaceae
- Genus: Protea
- Species: P. aurea
- Subspecies: P. a. subsp. potbergensis

Trinomial name
- Protea aurea subsp. potbergensis (Rourke) Rourke

= Protea aurea subsp. potbergensis =

Subspecies of tree

Protea aurea subsp. potbergensis, also known as the Potberg protea, or Potberg sugarbush, is a flowering plant of the genus Protea. It is endemic to South Africa and is found only in the Potberg near Cape Infanta. It grows to a height of 5 metres, and flowers primarily from May to June.

The plant dies after fire, but the seeds survive, and are spread by the wind. The plant is single-sexed. Pollination takes place through the activity of birds. The plant grows in sandy soils at elevations of 200 - 360m.

The plant's national number is 90.6.

== Gallery ==
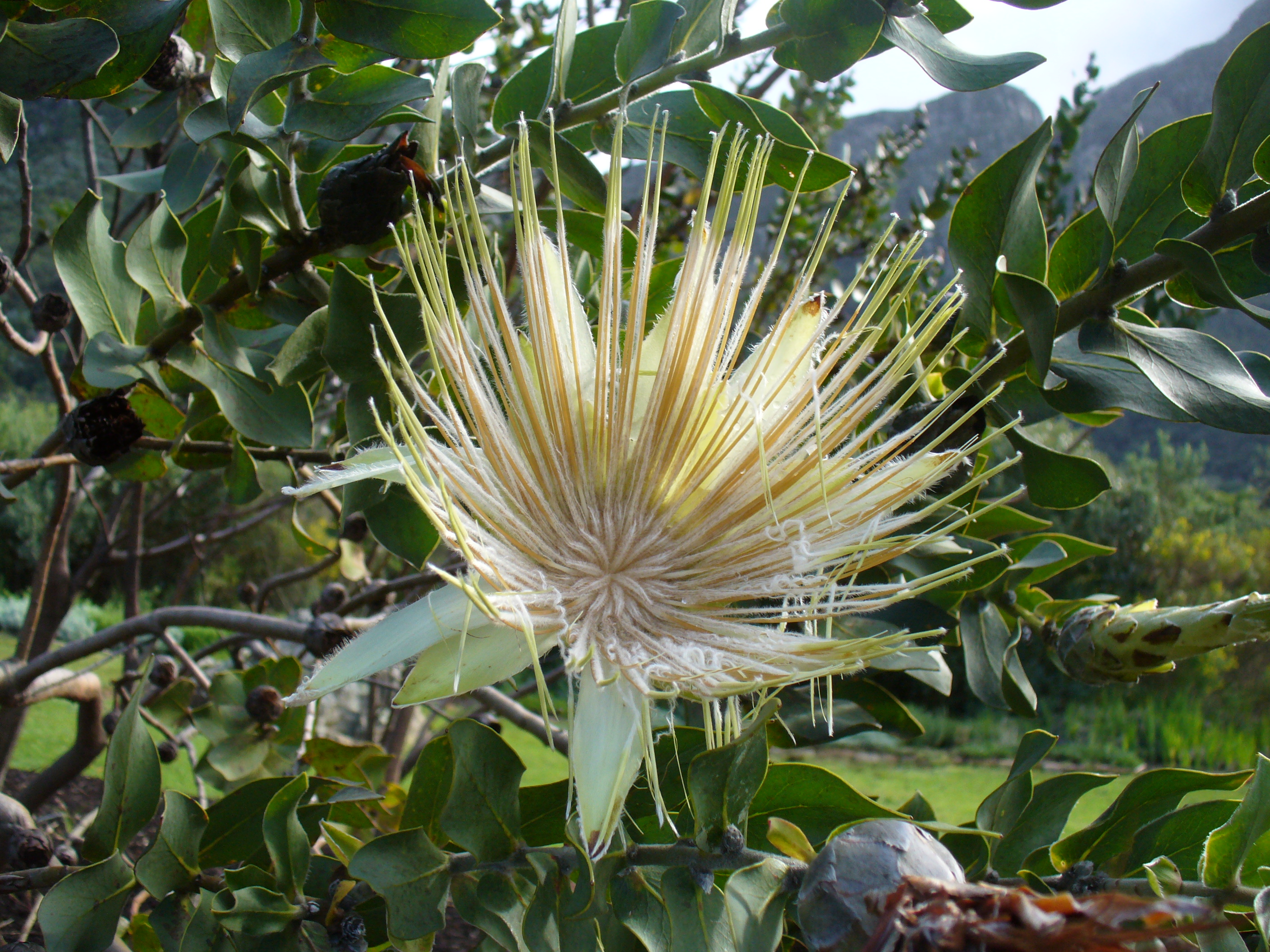

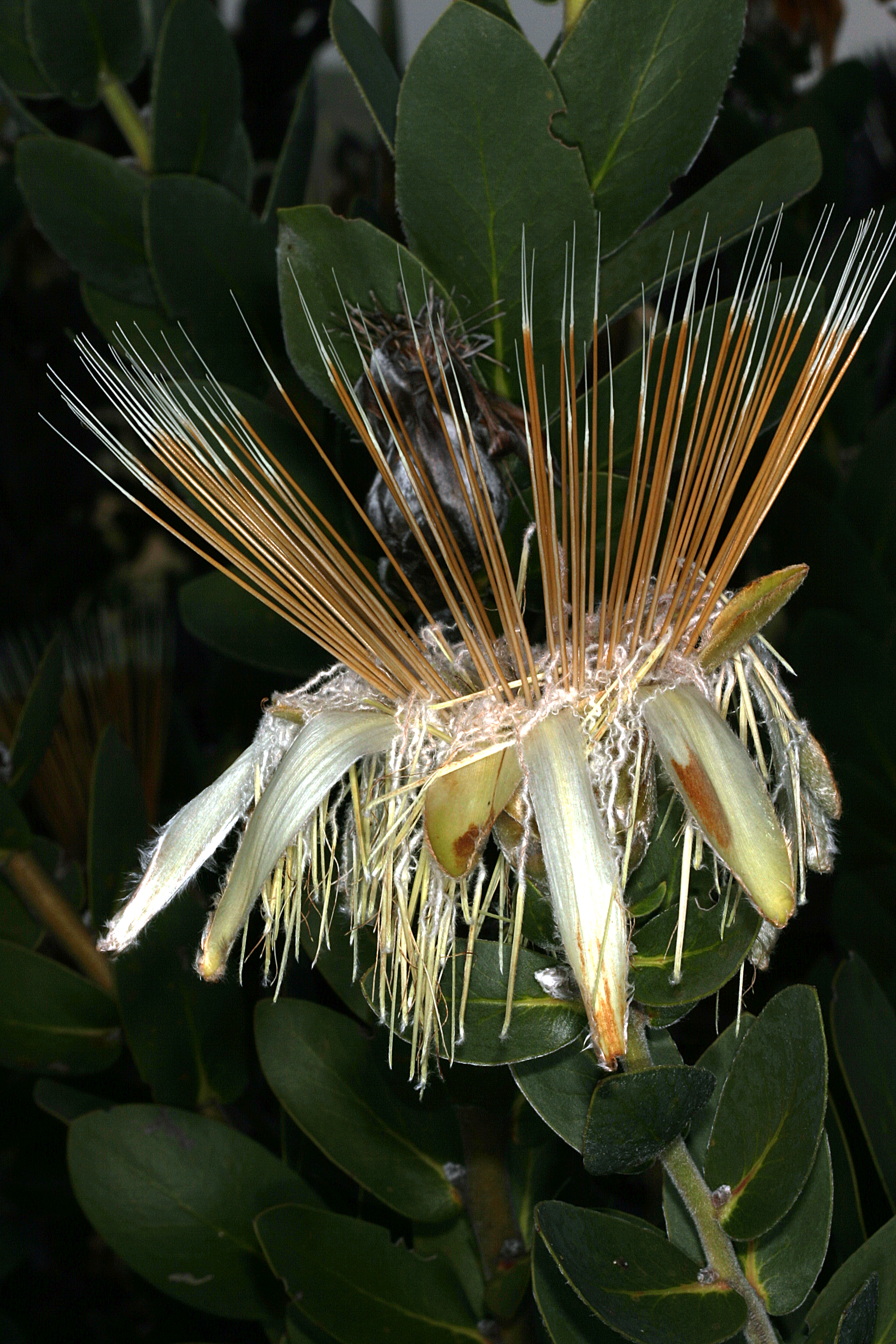

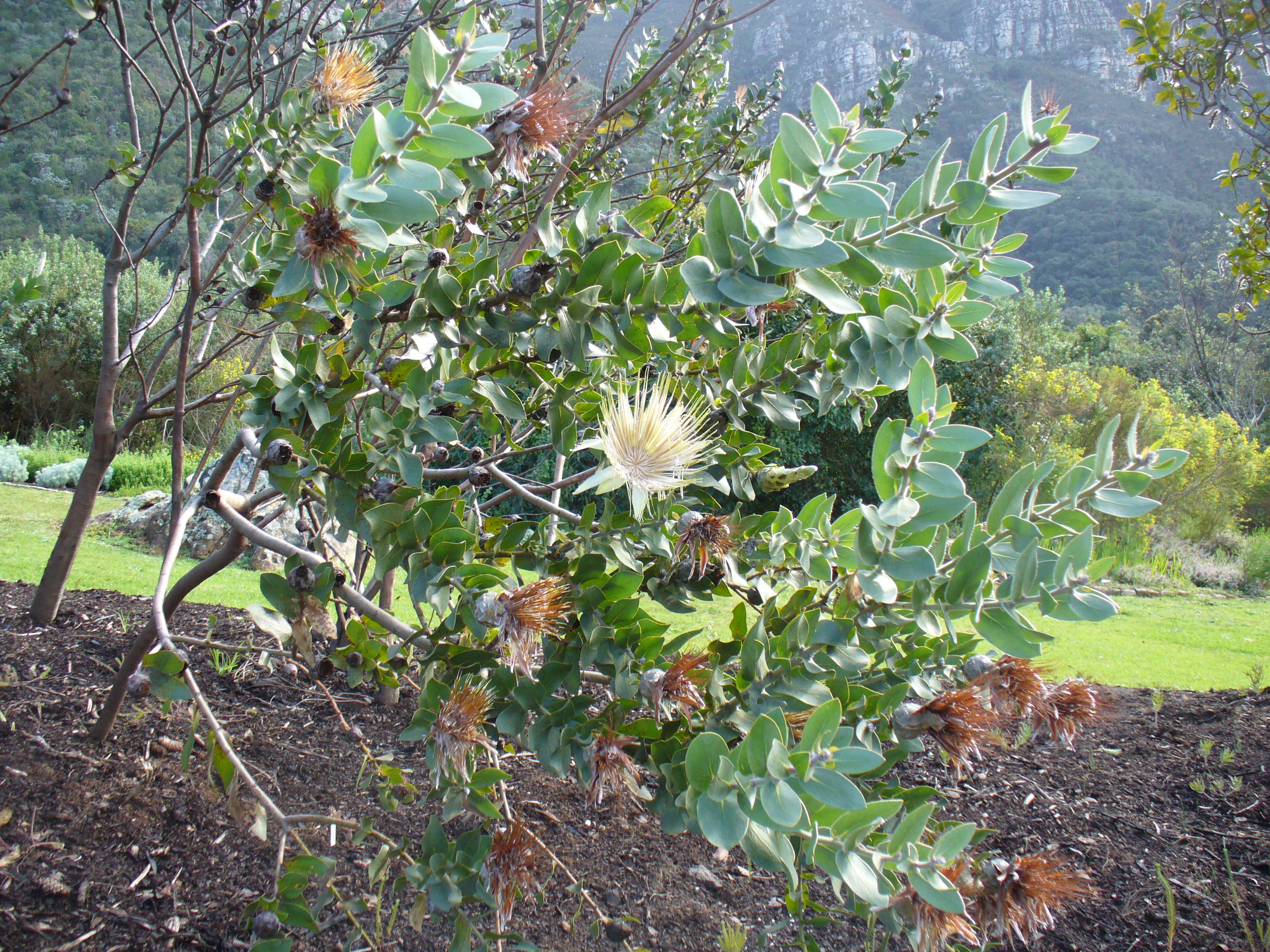

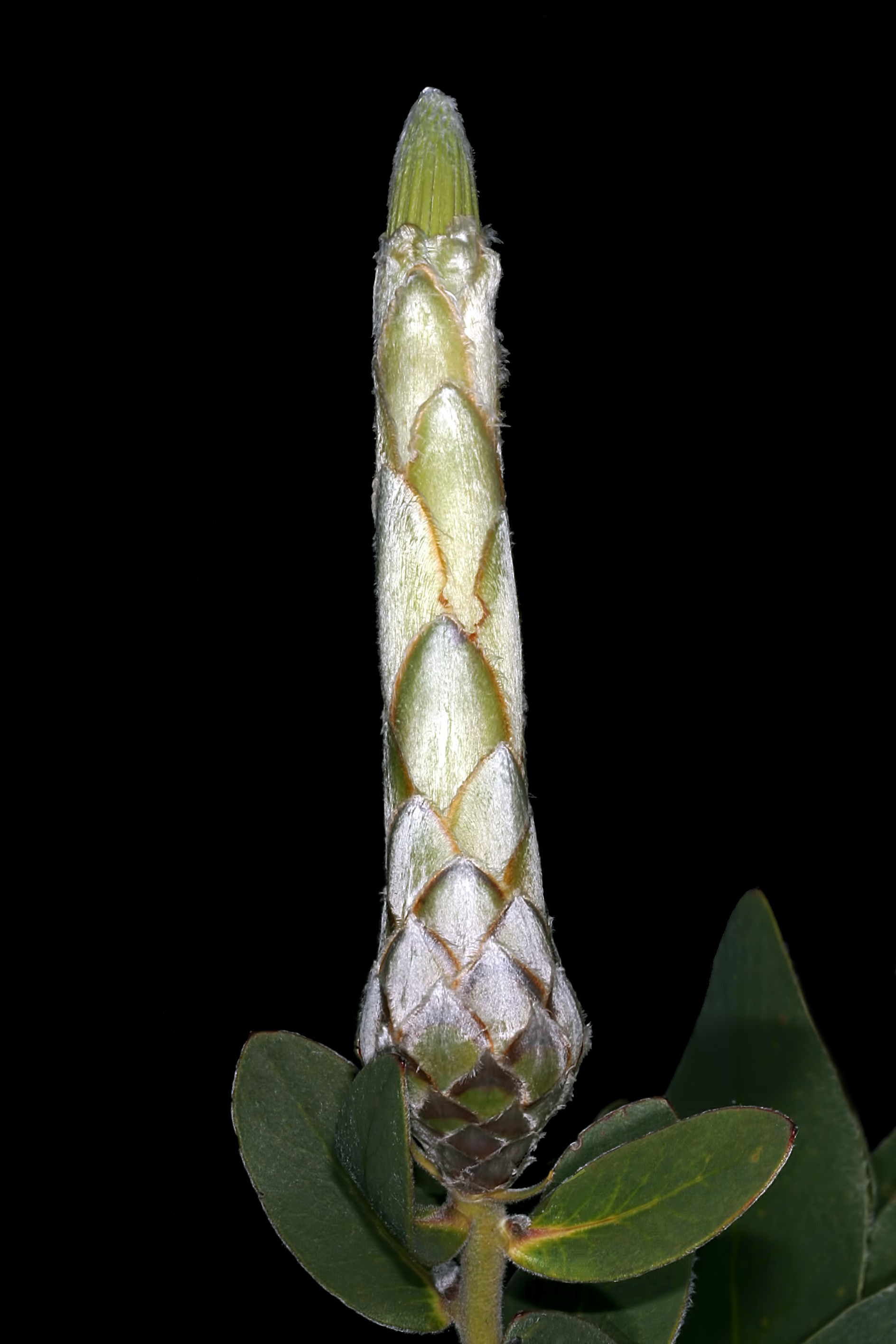

== See also ==
- List of Southern African indigenous trees and woody lianes
- List of Protea species
