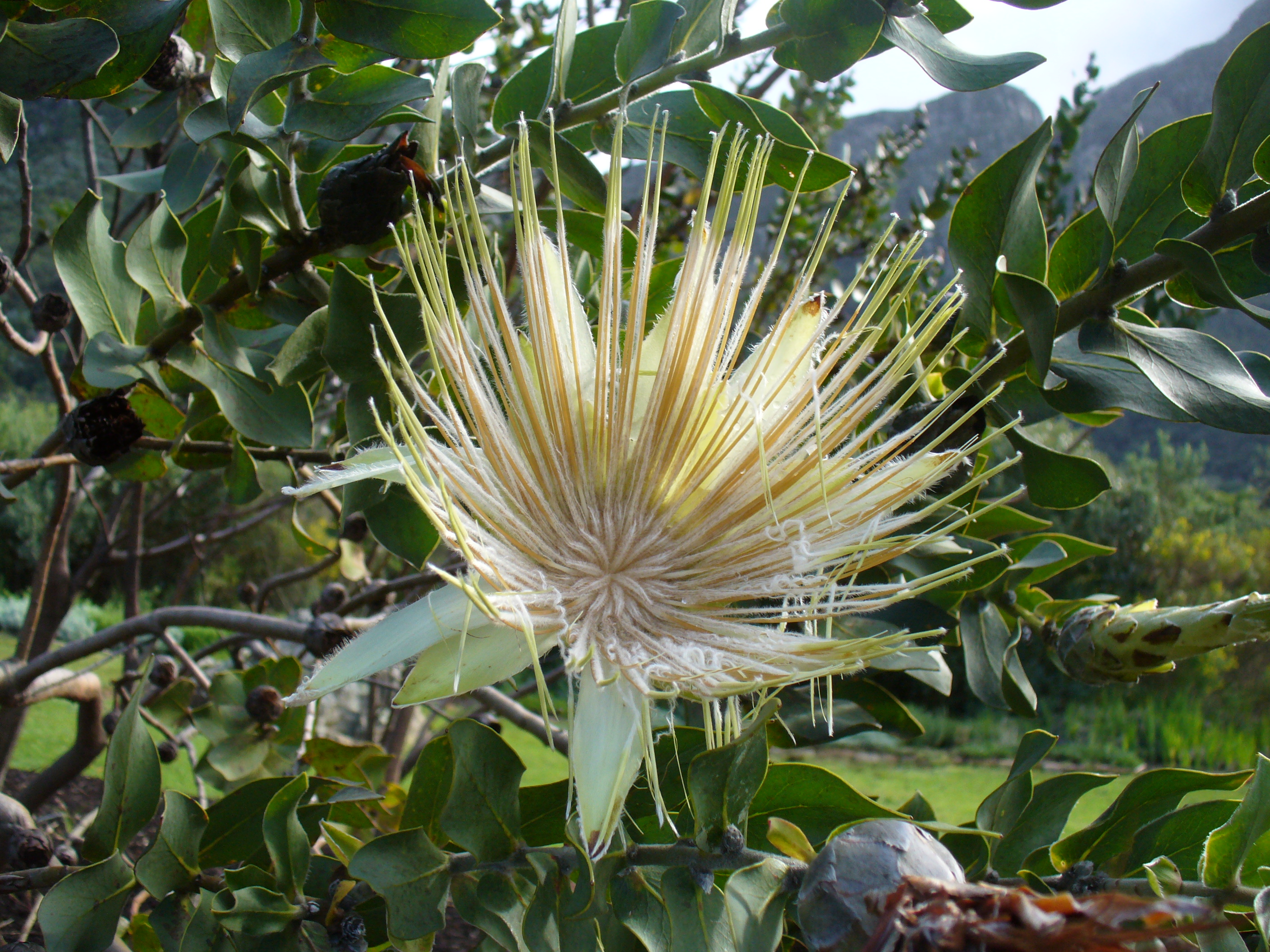
- P. aurea subsp. potbergensis

Conservation status
- Least Concern (IUCN 3.1)

Scientific classification
- Kingdom: Plantae
- Clade: Tracheophytes
- Clade: Angiosperms
- Clade: Eudicots
- Order: Proteales
- Family: Proteaceae
- Genus: Protea
- Species: P. aurea

Binomial name
- Protea aurea (Burm.f.) Rourke

= Protea aurea =

Species of shrub or small tree

Protea aurea, the long-bud sugarbush, is a shrub or small tree with a single trunk occurring in mountain fynbos, usually on cool, moist, southern slopes. It is endemic to the Cape Provinces of South Africa.

The flowerheads are solitary and resemble a shuttlecock when open. Fruit is a densely hairy nut. Two subspecies are recognised: subsp. aurea and subsp. potbergensis with the later being rare and restricted to the Potberg.
