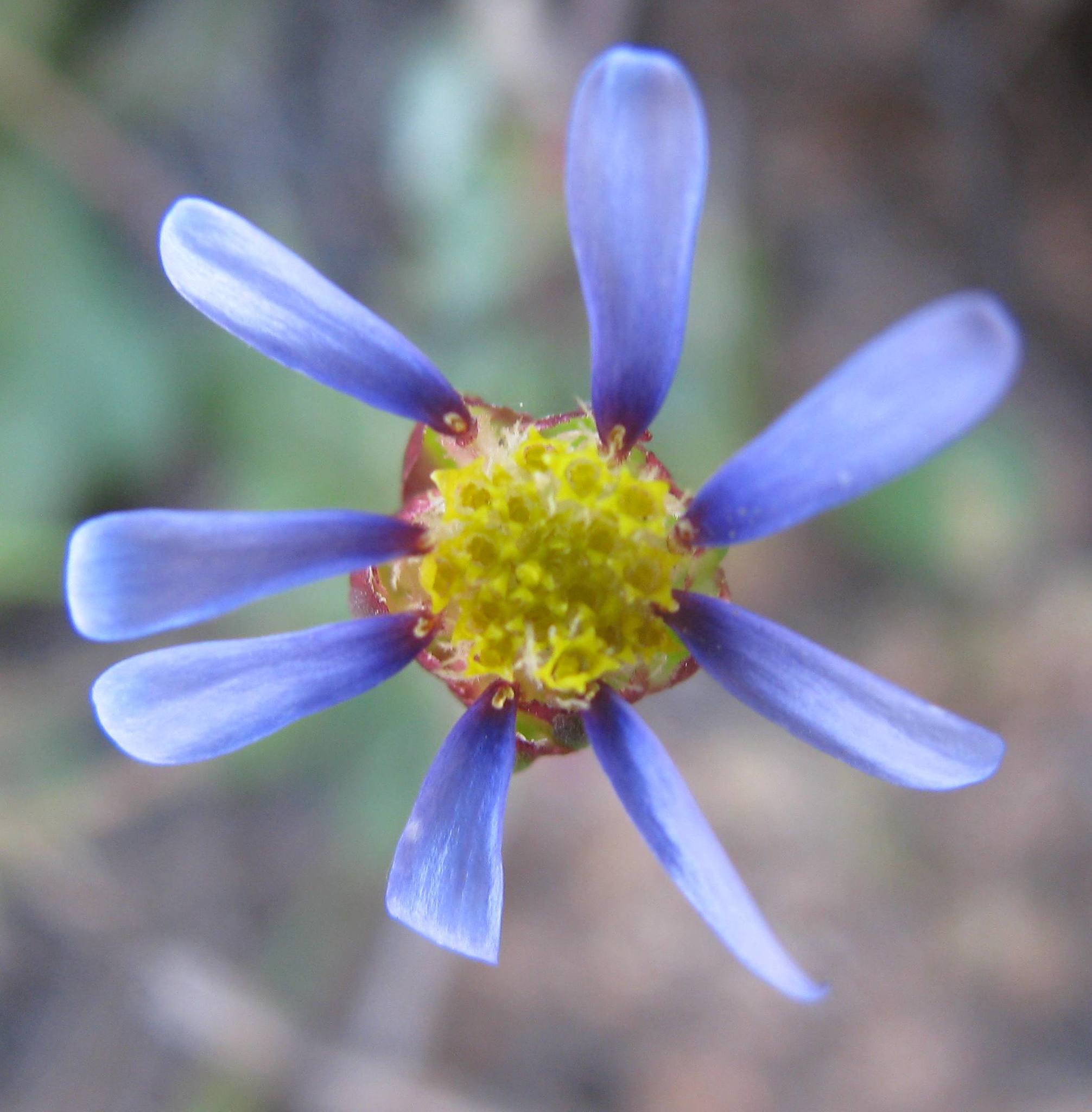

Scientific classification
- Kingdom: Plantae
- Clade: Tracheophytes
- Clade: Angiosperms
- Clade: Eudicots
- Clade: Asterids
- Order: Asterales
- Family: Asteraceae
- Genus: Felicia
- Section: Felicia sect. Neodetris
- Species: F. annectens

Binomial name
- Felicia annectens (Harv.) Grau

Synonyms
- Aster annectens Harv.

= Felicia annectens =

Annual plant in the daisy family from South Africa

Felicia annectens is an annual plant of up to about 25 cm (10 in) high, that is assigned to the family Asteraceae. The lower leaves are opposite and the higher leaves alternate. The bloated involucre consists of very broad, hairless bracts. These protect up to ten, short, bluish ray florets that encircle yellow, partly sterile disc florets. The heads sit individually on top of up to 6 cm (2 2/5 in) long stalks. The species was considered extinct after no observations were made after 1915, but was rediscovered in the 21st century. It occurs in the Western Cape province of South Africa.

== Description ==
Felicia annectens is an annual, branched or unbranched, tender herbaceous plant of up to 15 cm (6 in) high. Its leaves are set oppositely lower on the stem and alternately higher on the stem. They carry some bristly hairs, are inverted lance-shaped, up to 2 1/4 cm (0.87 in) long and 4 mm (0.16 in) wide, with an indistinct stalk, a pointy tip, and has an entire margin or rarely a few indistinct teeth.

The flower heads are individually set on top of an up to 6 cm (2 1/4 in) long stalk. The involucre is up to 5 mm (1/5 in) in diameter and consists of a double row of blunt 5–6 mm (0.20–0.24 in) long, almost hairless bracts, with a broad papery margin, which are often flushed red. The outer bracts are elliptical and about 2 mm (0.079 in) wide. The inner bracts are broadly elliptic to inverted egg-shaped and about 3 mm (0.12 in) wide. Each flower head has about ten ray florets with bluish staps of about 5 mm (0.20 in) long and 3 mm (0.12 in) wide with some hairs at the base. These encircle numerous disc florets, which are partly sterile, partly fertile, and have an up to 2 mm (0.079 in) long yellow corolla. In the center of each corolla are five anthers merged into a tube, through which the style grows when the floret opens, hoovering up the pollen on its shaft. At the tip of both style branches is a triangular appendage. Pappus is missing at the ray florets, but surrounding the base of the corolla of the disc florets are six to eight, up to 2 1/2 mm (0.1 in) long, quickly shunted pappus bristles. The eventually brown, dry, one-seeded, indehiscent fruits called cypselae of the fertile florets are broadly inverted egg-shaped in outline, about 4.5 mm (0.18 in) long and 3 mm (0.12 in) wide, with a pronounced ridge along the margin, with sturdy blunt hairs. The cypselae of sterile flowers are stunted and hairless.

=== Differences with related species ===
Felicia annectens is most related to Felicia bergeriana, but differs by the alternate leaves in the upper part of the stem, the very broad, hairless involucral bracts, and the fact that part of the disc florets are functionally, but not morphologically sterile.

== Taxonomy ==
William Henry Harvey was the first to describe this species in 1865, based on a specimen he had collected himself near Paarl in 1838, and called it Aster annectens. Jürke Grau in his 1973 Revision of the genus Felicia (Asteraceae) reassigned it to the genus Felicia, making the combination Felicia annectens. The species is considered to be part of the section Neodetris.

== Distribution, habitat and ecology ==
Felicia annectens was known in the 19th century from only five observations from Hopefield in the north, the northwest of the Cape Peninsula, near Paarl, and along the Sonderend River near Caledon. In the 21st century it was rediscovered in the upper Breede River valley west of Worcester.

== Conservation ==
The conservation status of Felicia annectens could not be established in 2018 because there were too few data available. Science assumed it had gone extinct because no observations after 1915 had been made. A few observations were made in the 21st century however.
