= Felicia alba =

Conservation status
- Least Concern (IUCN 3.1)

Scientific classification
- Kingdom: Plantae
- Clade: Tracheophytes
- Clade: Angiosperms
- Clade: Eudicots
- Clade: Asterids
- Order: Asterales
- Family: Asteraceae
- Genus: Felicia
- Section: Felicia sect. Longistylus
- Species: F. alba

Binomial name
- Felicia alba Grau

Species of flowering plant

Felicia alba is a species of flowering plant in the family Asteraceae. It is endemic to Namibia. Its habitat is sometimes degraded by livestock and agricultural crops, but its population is generally stable.
