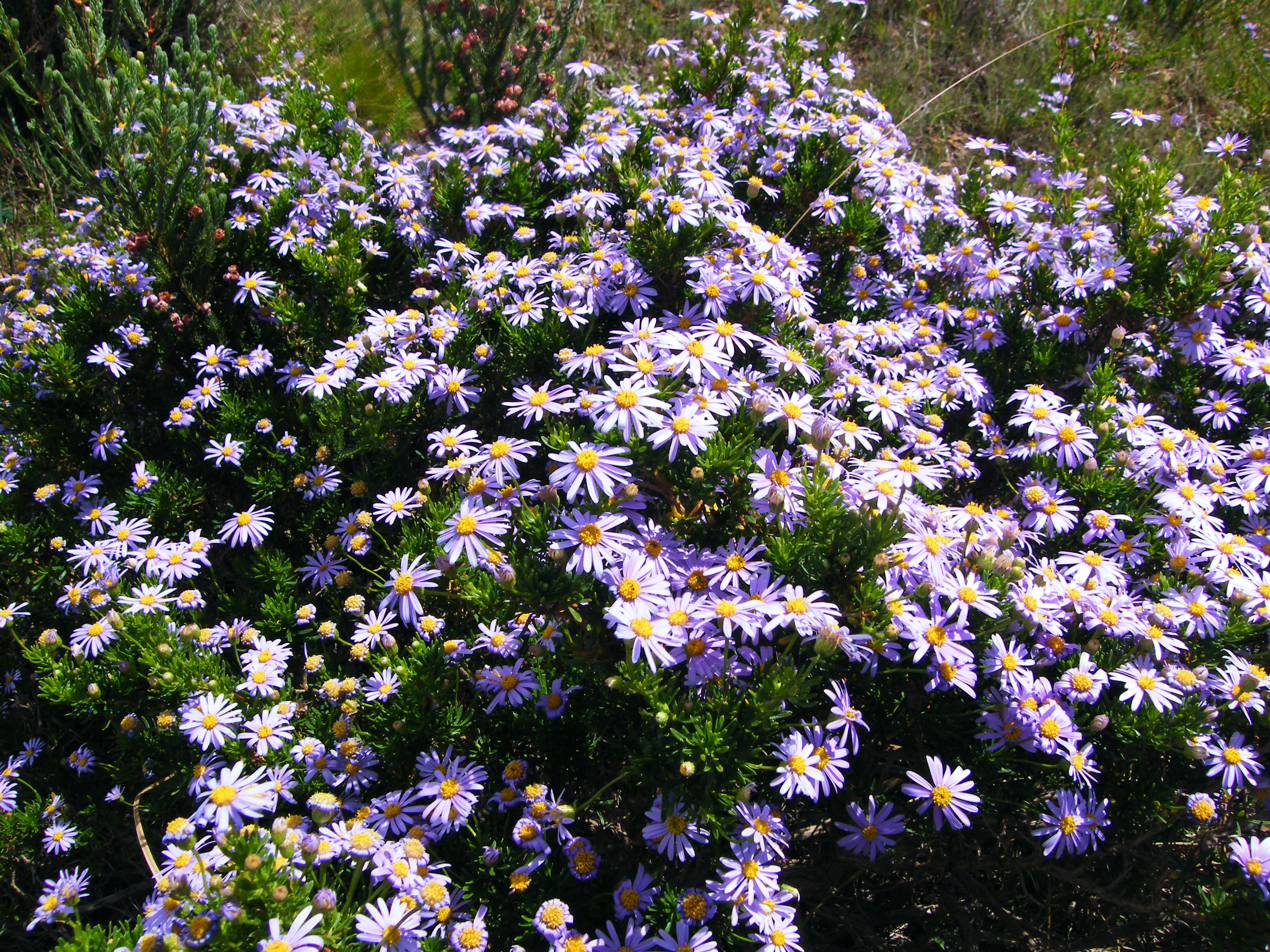

Scientific classification
- Kingdom: Plantae
- Clade: Tracheophytes
- Clade: Angiosperms
- Clade: Eudicots
- Clade: Asterids
- Order: Asterales
- Family: Asteraceae
- Genus: Felicia
- Section: Felicia sect. Lignofelicia
- Species: F. fruticosa

Binomial name
- Felicia fruticosa (L.) G.Nicholson

Subspecies
- subsp. fruticosa; subsp. brevipedunculata

Synonyms
- Aster fruticosus; A. fruticulosus; Diplopappus fruticulosus; Diplostephium fruticulosum; Diplopappus fruticosus; Diplostephium longipes; Diplostephium extenuatum; Diplopappus extenuatus

= Felicia fruticosa =

Bush Felicia

Shrublet in the daisy family from South Africa

Felicia fruticosa, the bush felicia, is a strongly branching shrub of up to 1.3 metres (4 ft 3 in) high that is assigned to the family Asteraceae with flower heads consisting of about twenty purple to white ray florets encircling many yellow disc florets, and small flat, entire and hairless leathery leaves. Two subspecies are recognized. Felicia fruticosa subsp. brevipedunculata, from the Limpopo Province of South Africa is up to 1.3 metres (4 ft 3 in) tall and has longer leaves of 2.5 centimetres (0.98 in) long and 2 millimetres (0.079 in) wide and nearly seated pale violet to white flower heads. Felicia fruticosa subsp. fruticosa, from the Western Cape province of South Africa, is no more than 1 m and has shorter leaves of 1.25 centimetres (0.49 in) long and 2.5 millimetres (0.098 in) wide with flower heads on largely leafless, about 2.5 centimetres (0.98 in) long stems. It is sometimes called bosastertjie in Afrikaans. In the wild, flower occurs from August till October.

== Description ==
Felicia fruticosa is a strongly branching shrub of up to 1 or 1.3 metres (4 ft 3 in) high. The trunk and side branches have fibrous, peeling, greyish brown bark, and end in young, non-flowering long shoots. In the leaf axils of the two-year-old and older long shoots are moderately branching short shoots with one to three floral heads each. The slightly succulent leaves are alternately set, lance-shaped to inverted lance-shaped, up to 1.25 centimetres (0.49 in) long and 2.5 millimetres (0.098 in) wide, with a pointy tip in the typical subspecies, or always distinctly inverted lance-shaped and up to 2.5 centimetres (0.98 in) long and 2 millimetres (0.079 in) wide in subsp. brevipedunculata. The flat surface is hairless and indistinctly spotted by round resin glands lying in the leaf blade. The broadened leaf base slightly runs down the stem, and is hairless or has a ciliate margin and has woolly hairs in the axil.

The floral heads are medium in size. They sit on largely leafless, up to 2.5 centimetres (0.98 in) long inflorescence stalks in the typical subspecies. In subsp. brevipedunculata, the heads are practically without stalk and sit directly in the rosette of the short shoots. The involucral bracts are overlapping, arranged in up to four rows, and about 8 millimetres (0.31 in) in diameter. These bracts increase in size from the outside in, the outermost bracts 1.5 millimetres (0.059 in) long and .5 millimetres (0.020 in) wide, the innermost 4 millimetres (0.16 in) long and 1 millimetre (0.039 in) wide, lance-shaped with resinous calluses, yellow-brown in colour, with a smooth edge, and hairless except for the lowest which are slightly woolly at the inner base.

There are up to about twenty medium or light purple, rarely white, ray flowers per head, each of which has a strap called ligule of approximately 10 millimetres (0.39 in) long and 2 millimetres (0.079 in) wide. These encircle numerous yellow disc florets, each with a crown of up to 4 millimetres (0.16 in) long. In the middle of each disc floret, the five anthers are merged into a tube through which the style grows when the floret opens. At the tip of both of the style branches is narrow triangular appendage. At the base of each floret are numerous pappus bristles of two lengths, the shorter ones white, scaly, persistent and about 0.1 millimetres (0.0039 in) long. When mature, the dry, one-seeded, indehiscent fruits called cypselae are dark brown with a lighter margin, 2.5 millimetres (0.098 in) long and 1 millimetre (0.039 in) wide, narrowly obovate in outline, with a scaly epidermis, and loosely evenly silky hairy.

Felicia fruticosa is a diploid having nine sets of homologue chromosomes (2n=18).

=== Differences between the subspecies ===
Felicia fruticosa subsp. fruticosa reaches a height of maximally 1 metre (3 ft 3 in), has lance-shaped to inverted lance-shaped leaves of up to 1.25 centimetres (0.49 in) long and 2.5 millimetres (0.098 in) wide. The heads are on practically leafless, up to 2.5 centimetres (0.98 in) long peduncles. The ray florets are violet, rarely white, the short pappus bristles are 0.1 millimetres (0.0039 in) long. In contrast, Felicia fruticosa subsp. brevipedunculata grows to 1.33 metres (4 ft 4 in) tall, has slightly larger leaves up to 2.5 centimetres (0.98 in) long and 2 millimetres (0.079 in) wide, that are always distinctly inverted lance-shaped. The heads are practically without stalk and sit directly in the rosette of the short shoots. The ray florets are light violet to white, the short pappus bristles are with 0.3 millimetres (0.012 in), slightly longer than in the subsp. fruticosa.

== Taxonomy ==
This species was first described from the Cape by Carl Linnaeus in 1764 as Aster fruticosus. In 1803, Carl Ludwig Willdenow invalidly changed the name to Aster fruticulosus. In 1828, Henri Cassini described another specimen as Diplostephium longipes. When Christian Friedrich Lessing reassigned Linnaeus's species, he maintained Willdenow's change, calling the species Diplopappus fruticulosus. Nees von Esenbeck also kept the invalid name, when he moved it again, creating the combination Diplostephium fruticulosum in 1833. In the same publication he also described Diplostephium extenuatum, which was reassigned by Augustin Pyramus de Candolle, who made the name Diplopappus extenuatus in 1836. George Nicholson proposed to include the species in the genus Felicia and so made the combination that is currently in use: Felicia fruticosa. Margaret Levyns published a correction of Lessing's error in 1948, making the combination Diplopappus fruticosus. In 1973 Jürke Grau considered all these names synonymous.

The subspecies from the Limpopo Province was initially described by John Hutchinson as Aster brevipedunculatus in 1931. Grau changed its status in 1973 to Felicia fruticosa subsp. brevipedunculatus.

Felicia fruticosa is the type species of the section Lignofelicia.

The species name fruticosa is a Latin word meaning "shrubby".

== Distribution ==
Felicia fruticosa subsp. fruticosa is an endemic of the Cape Peninsula and the surroundings of Stellenbosch. Felicia fruticosa subsp. brevipedunculata is known from the Soutpansberg, Blouberg and the Portugal Farm in the Limpopo Province of South Africa, where it occurs at elevations between 1,300 and 1,850 metres (4,270 and 6,070 ft).

== Conservation ==
The continued survival of both subspecies of Felicia fruticosa is considered to be of least concern because their populations are stable.
