= Felicia clavipilosa =

Scientific classification
- Kingdom: Plantae
- Clade: Tracheophytes
- Clade: Angiosperms
- Clade: Eudicots
- Clade: Asterids
- Order: Asterales
- Family: Asteraceae
- Genus: Felicia
- Section: Felicia sect. Felicia
- Species: F. clavipilosa

Binomial name
- Felicia clavipilosa Grau

Subspecies
- subsp. clavipilosa; subsp. transvaalensis

Synonyms
- F. hyssopifolia auct. non F. hyssopifolia (P.J.Bergius) Nees

Shrublet in the daisy family from South Africa

Felicia clavipilosa is an upright, richly branched shrub of up to 60 cm (2 ft) high, that is assigned to the family Asteraceae. It has alternately arranged leaves, and flower heads with 3–4 whorls of involucral bracts with many yellow disc florets in the centre. Very characteristic for the species are the short club-shaped hairs on its fruits. There are two subspecies. Subsp. clavipilosa has narrowly lance-shaped entire leaves with one vein and pale mauve ray florets. Subspecies transvaalensis has lance-shaped leaves with one or three veins and white ray florets. The species occurs in southern Africa, with subsp. clavipilosa having a western distribution in Zambia, Zimbabwe, Namibia, Botswana and South Africa, and subsp. transvaalensis restricted to the east, from Zimbabwe, through Botswana to South Africa. The subspecies transvaalensis is sometimes called pokkiesblom in Afrikaans.

== Description ==
Felicia clavipilosa subsp. clavipilosa is an upright, richly branched shrub of up to 60 cm (2 ft) high. The stems are woody and pale brown, but in the upper part herbaceous, green, with appressed hairs or very glandular, especially near the tips, and then with perpendicular bristles. The leaves are arranged alternately, lack a leaf stalk, are narrowly lance-shaped to narrowly inverted lance-shaped in outline, 1–5 cm (1/2–2 in) long and 1–3 1/2 mm (0.04–0.14 in) wide, flat, with a single vein, bristly hairs pressed against the surface, or perpendicular bristly and glandularly hairy.

The flower heads sit individually at the tip of an indistinct inflorescence stalk. These stalks are up to about 2 cm long, leafy, mostly covered in protruding bristly hairs and glands. The greenish involucre that envelops the florets is up to 5 mm (0.20 in) in diameter, and consists of three to four rows of overlapping bracts that are lance-shaped to inverted lance-shaped. The bracts in the outer whorl are about 2 mm (0.079 in) long and 0.5 mm (0.020 in) wide, covered in bristly hair and often with glands. The bracts in the inner whorl are about 3 1/2 mm (0.14 in) long and 3/4 mm (0.03 in) wide, eventually hairless and have an indistinct papery margin.

About twenty five female ray florets have pale violet straps of about 5 1/2 mm (0.22 in) long and 1 mm (0.04 in) wide. In the center of the head are many yellow, bisexual disc florets of about 3 mm (0.12 in) long. In the center of the corolla of each disc floret are five anthers merged into a tube, through which the style grows when the floret opens, hoovering up the pollen on its shaft. The style in both ray- and disc florets forks, and at the tip of both style branches is a triangular appendage.

Surrounding the base of the corolla are white, serrated, deciduous pappus bristles of about 3 mm (0.12 in) long. The eventually yellowish brown, dry, one-seeded, indehiscent fruits called cypselae are inverted egg-shaped, about 2.5 mm (0.098 in) long and 1 mm (0.039 in) wide, with a prominent ridge along the margin, with some scales on its surface and unique, short, club-shaped hairs.

=== Differences between the subspecies ===
The subspecies transvaalensis is a tetraploid (4n=36) that differs from the diploid nominate subsp. clavipilosa (2n=18) by its much wider leaves of up to 6 mm (0.24 in), is always set with perpendicular, bristly hairs and never has glands. It is also characterised by longer involucral bracts that may be 5 mm (0.20 in) long in the inner whorl, and the ray florets that are almost always white. Finally, the sterile cypselae are quick to lose their club-shaped hairs.

=== Differences with related species ===
F. clavipilosa differs from all other Felicia species by the club-shaped hairs on the cypselae. It differs from F. deserti by its strongly branching habit, subsp. clavipilosa in addition differs by the always protruding bristly hairs. Young branches of F. hyssopifolia are white felty.

== Taxonomy ==
Rudolf Schlechter was the first to recognise the distinctiveness of this species from F. hyssopifolia, but he never published a description or name. Jürke Grau described it in his 1973 Revision of the genus Felicia, based on a collection made near Klein Windhoek in Namibia by Hermann Merxmüller and Willi Giess in 1957, and he named it Felicia clavipilosa. He described in the same publication a somewhat different form, collected by Cornelis Eliza Bertus Bremekamp and Herold Georg Wilhelm Johannes Schweickerdt at the westside of Soutpansberg in 1931, which he called F. clavipilosa subsp. transvaalensis. The species is considered to be part of the section Felicia.

== Distribution, ecology and conservation ==
Felicia clavipilosa subsp. clavipilosa occurs in Botswana, Namibia, southern and western Zimbabwe, Northern Cape and North West provinces of South Africa. In Zambia an isolated population occurs near Lusaka. In Zimbabwe it grows in open, often disturbed places in woodland and grassland.

Felicia clavipilosa subsp. transvaalensis can be found in southeastern Botswana, the Limpopo, Gauteng, and Mpumalanga provinces of South Africa, and western, central and southern Zimbabwe.

In South Africa, the continued survival of both subspecies is considered to be of least concern.
