= Felicia deserti =

Scientific classification
- Kingdom: Plantae
- Clade: Tracheophytes
- Clade: Angiosperms
- Clade: Eudicots
- Clade: Asterids
- Order: Asterales
- Family: Asteraceae
- Genus: Felicia
- Species: F. deserti

Binomial name
- Felicia deserti Schltr. ex Grau

Synonyms
- Felicia desertiSchltr.; Felicia desertiSchltr. ex Hutch.

South African plant species

Felicia deserti is a species of plant from South Africa. It belongs to the daisy family.

== Description ==
This shrub grows up to 2 m (6.6 ft) tall. The oblanceolate leaves are alternately arranged and covered in thick hair. Solitary radiate flowerheads are borne on hairy stems and surrounded by three or four overlapping rows of bracts. The ray (external) florets are blue, and the disc (central) florets are yellow. Flowers are present in September. The cypselas (seeds with a fluffy tuft growing out the top) have short hairs.

== Distribution ==
This species has been found growing in South Africa. Its distribution ranges from Uppington to Namaqualand.
