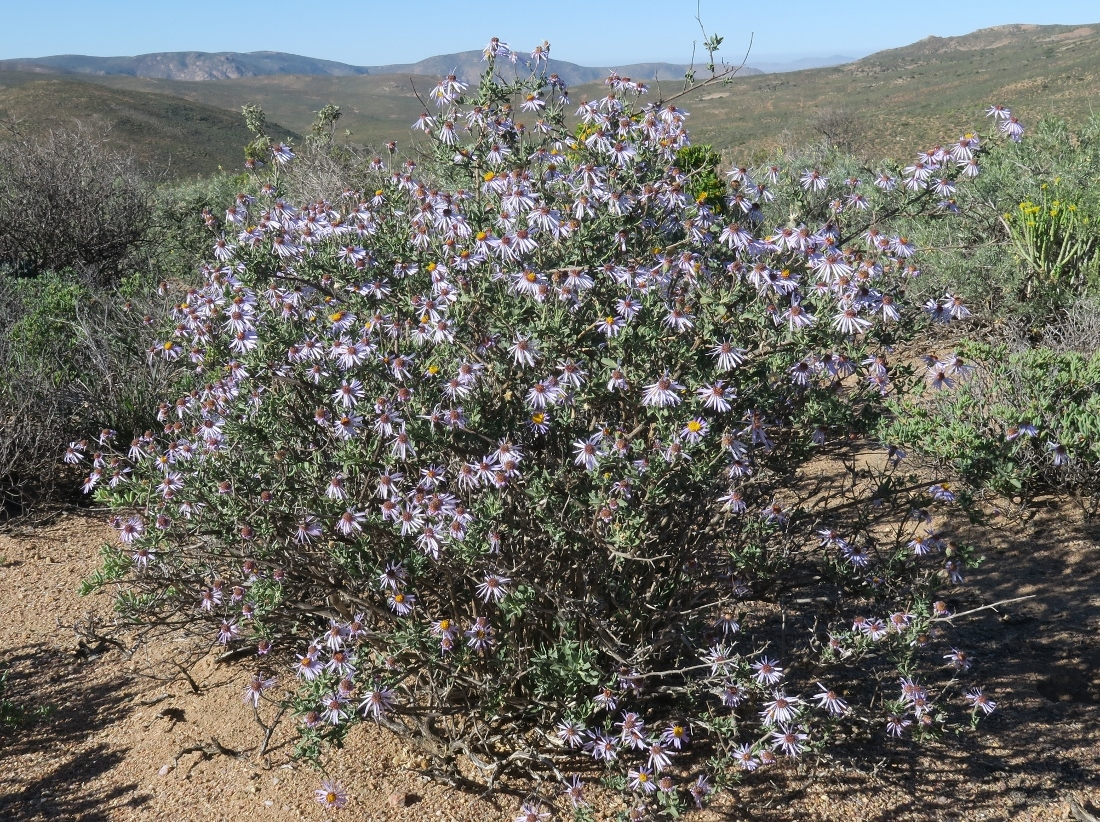

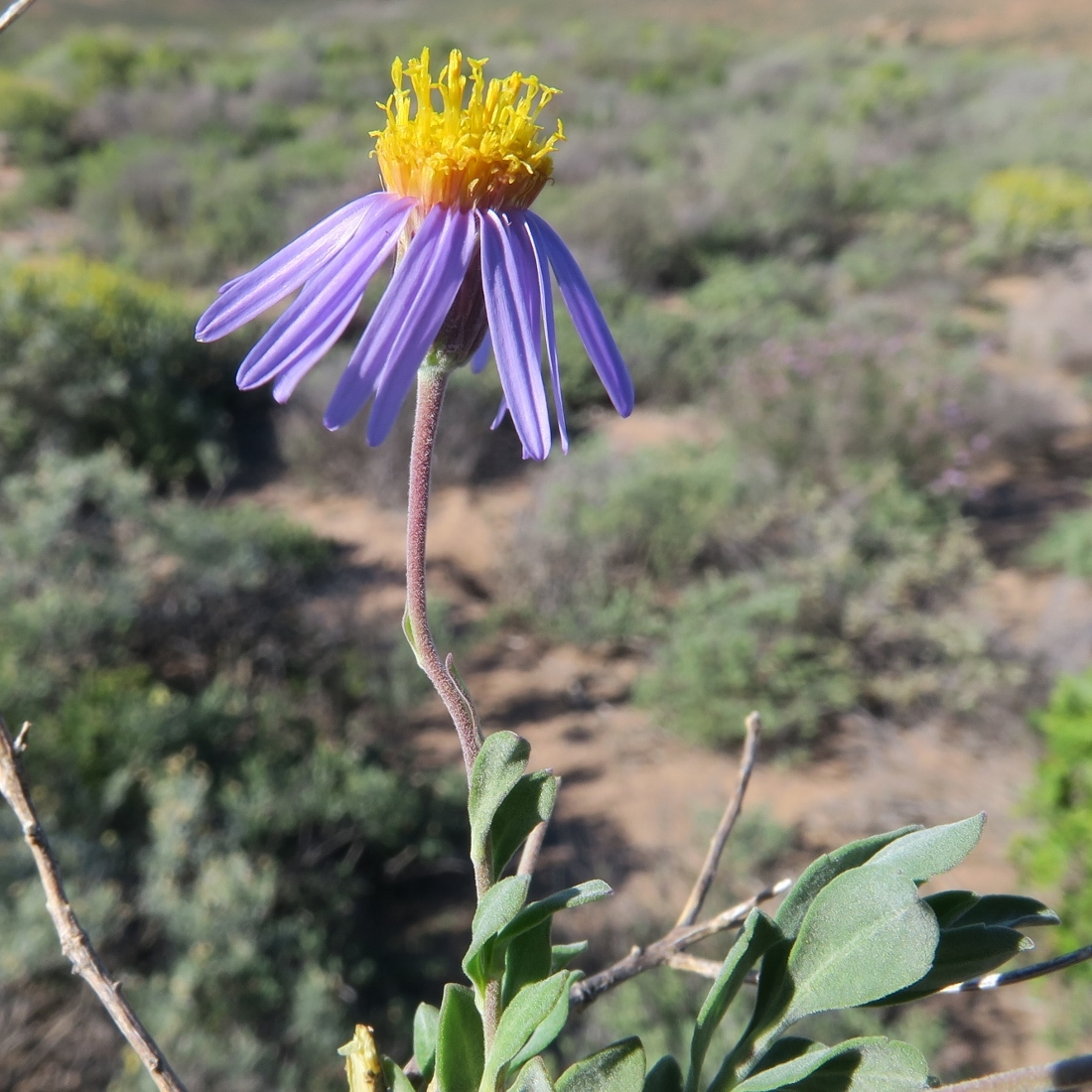

Scientific classification
- Kingdom: Plantae
- Clade: Tracheophytes
- Clade: Angiosperms
- Clade: Eudicots
- Clade: Asterids
- Order: Asterales
- Family: Asteraceae
- Genus: Felicia
- Section: Felicia sect. Lignofelicia
- Species: F. dregei

Binomial name
- Felicia dregei DC.

= Felicia dregei =

Shrublet in the daisy family from South Africa

Felicia dregei is an evergreen, glandular shrub of up to 1 1/2 m (5 ft) high, that is assigned to the family Asteraceae. It has flat, finely felty, grayish green, narrowly elliptic to lance-shaped leaves of up to 4 cm (1 1/2 in) long and 8 mm (1/3 in) wide, with an entire margin or here and there with up to ten teeth. The flower heads have about ten violet ray florets, encircling many yellow disc florets. This species grows in the Northern Cape and Western Cape provinces of South Africa.

== Description ==
Felicia dregei is an evergreen, upright, up to 1 1/2 m (5 ft) high shrub, and is very woody near its base, where it is covered with a brown, peeling bark. The older branches have elongated, indistinct short shoots, and end in long shoots. The leaves are alternately set, narrowly elliptic to lance-shaped, up to 4 cm (1 1/2 in) long and 8 mm (1/3 in) wide, and get much smaller higher up. Most leaves have an entire margin, but there are also leaves with up to ten short teeth. The leaf surface is gray-green and velvety, due to short glandular and bristly hairs on both leaf surfaces. Rarely, the leaves do not have glands but only short bristles.

The flower heads sit individually on top of a short stalk at the top of the long shoots. The peduncles are up to 5 cm (2.0 in) long, with few bracts, especially at the top mostly with glandular hairs. The involucre is up to 1 3/4 cm (0.7 in) in diameter and consists of three to four rows of bracts. These bracts are overlapping, densely glandular, and have a papery margin in particular above the middle. Around ten female ray florets have violet ligules of about 15 mm (3/5 in) long and 2 mm (0.079 in) wide. They encircle numerous bisexual yellow disc florets, with a yellow, often tinged reddish brown, corolla of about 7 mm (0.28 in) long. In the center of each corolla are five anthers merged into a tube, through which the style grows when the floret opens, hoovering up the pollen on its shaft. At the tip of both style branches is a narrowly triangular appendage. Around the base of the corolla are numerous, yellowish white, short-toothed, persistent pappus bristles, which are all of the same length, up to about 6 mm (1/4 in). The dry, one-seeded, indehiscent fruits called cypselae are dark brown with a yellowish brown ridge along the outline, elliptic, about 3 1/2 mm long and 1 1/2 mm wide, thinly silky haired but densely hairy on the edge, and the hairs seldom wear off.

== Taxonomy ==
As far as known, Felicia dregei was first collected for science by Johann Franz Drège in 1830, and described by Augustin Pyramus de Candolle in 1836. William Henry Harvey reassigned the species and made the combination Aster dregei in 1865. Karl August Otto Hoffmann distinguished a variation with somewhat deeper incised leaves as Felicia dregei var. incisa in 1905. In 1973 Jürke Grau considered these names synonymous. F. dregei is considered part of the section Lignofelicia.

== Distribution and habitat ==
Felicia dregei can be found in Little Namaqualand in the north to Saldanha and the Mountains bordering the Karoo in the west, South Africa, where it grows on dolorite koppies and slopes.

== Conservation ==
The continued survival of Felicia dregei is considered to be of least concern because its population is stable.
