= Felicia smaragdina =

Scientific classification
- Kingdom: Plantae
- Clade: Tracheophytes
- Clade: Angiosperms
- Clade: Eudicots
- Clade: Asterids
- Order: Asterales
- Family: Asteraceae
- Genus: Felicia
- Section: Felicia sect. Longistylus
- Species: F. smaragdina

Binomial name
- Felicia smaragdina (S.Moore) Merxm.

Synonyms
- Detris smaragdina; Detris smaragdina var. versicolor; Felicia nana

Annual plant in the daisy family from South Africa

Felicia smaragdina is an annual, bristly and glandular, much branched plant of up to 40 cm (1 1/3 ft) high, that has been assigned to the family Asteraceae. It has seated, slightly succulent, line-shaped leaves of up to 3 cm (1 1/5 in) long and about 1 mm (0.04 in) wide. Its flower heads sit individually at the tip of the branches, and contain about twenty yellow ray florets of about 8 mm (1/3 in) long and 1 1/2 mm (0.06 in) wide, surrounding many yellow disc florets. A unique character is that when dried, the florets become greenish. The species is an endemic species of Namibia.

== Description ==
Felicia smaragdina is an annual, up to 40 cm (1 1/3 ft) high, much branched plant. The leaves are alternately arranged on the stem, except for the very lowest pair, line-shaped, up to 3 cm (1 1/5 in) long and about 1 mm (0.04 in), rarely up to 2 mm (0.08 in) wide, not narrowed at base, seated, somewhat succulent in consistency, with some rough hairs pressed to the surface.

The flower heads are set individually on top of a vaguely defined, up to 4 cm (1 3/5 in) long stalk, which carries both bracts, bristles and glandular hairs. The florets are protected by an involucre of 3–4 mm (0.12–0.16 in) in diameter that consists of three or four whorls of bracts. These bracts contain resin ducts and have bristles and glandular hairs. The outer bracts are lance-shaped, about 2 1/2 mm (0.1 in) long and 0.3 mm (0.012 in) wide, the inner inverted lance-shaped, about 4 1/2 mm (0.18 in) long and 0.8 mm (0.031 in) wide. About twenty yellow ray florets have about 8 mm (1/3 in) long and 1 1/2 mm (0.06 in) wide straps that change to a greenish color when dried. The many disc florets have yellow corollas of about 3 mm long. Characteristically, the appendage at the tip of both of the branches of the style is linear in shape. Surrounding the base of the corolla are many white, deciduous pappus bristles of up to about 3 1/2 mm (0.14 in) long set with long teeth near their base. The short haired, eventually greenish brown, dry, one-seeded, indehiscent fruits called cypselae are inverted egg-shaped, about 1.8 mm (0.071 in) long and 0.8 mm (0.031 in) wide, and have a lighter ridge around the margin.

=== Differences from other species ===
Felicia smaragdina is one of only few species of Felicia with yellow ray florets, which in F. smaragdina uniquely turn to a greenish colour when dried. It differs from F. mossamedensis that has a triangular appendage at the tip of the style branches, where F. smaragdina has line-shaped appendages. Compared to F. boehmii, F. smaragdina has lighter florets and narrower leaves that never have teeth.

== Taxonomy ==
Spencer Le Marchant Moore was the first to describe this species, and he named it Detris smaragdina in 1899, based on a collection made by T.G. Een, in Damaraland, Namibia, in 1879. Moore distinguished a slightly different specimen as Detris smaragdina var. versicolor in 1904, this one based on a collection made by Kurt Dinter in Eromhunga, Namibia. Johannes Mattfeld described a specimen collected by Adolf Engler in 1913 at the old railway line near kilometer marker 114 in Damaraland, and named it Felicia nana. Hermann Merxmüller reassigned Moore's species and made the combination Felicia smaragdina in 1954. Jürke Grau considered all these named synonymous in his 1973 Revision of the genus Felicia.

== Distribution ==
This species is only known from Namibia.
