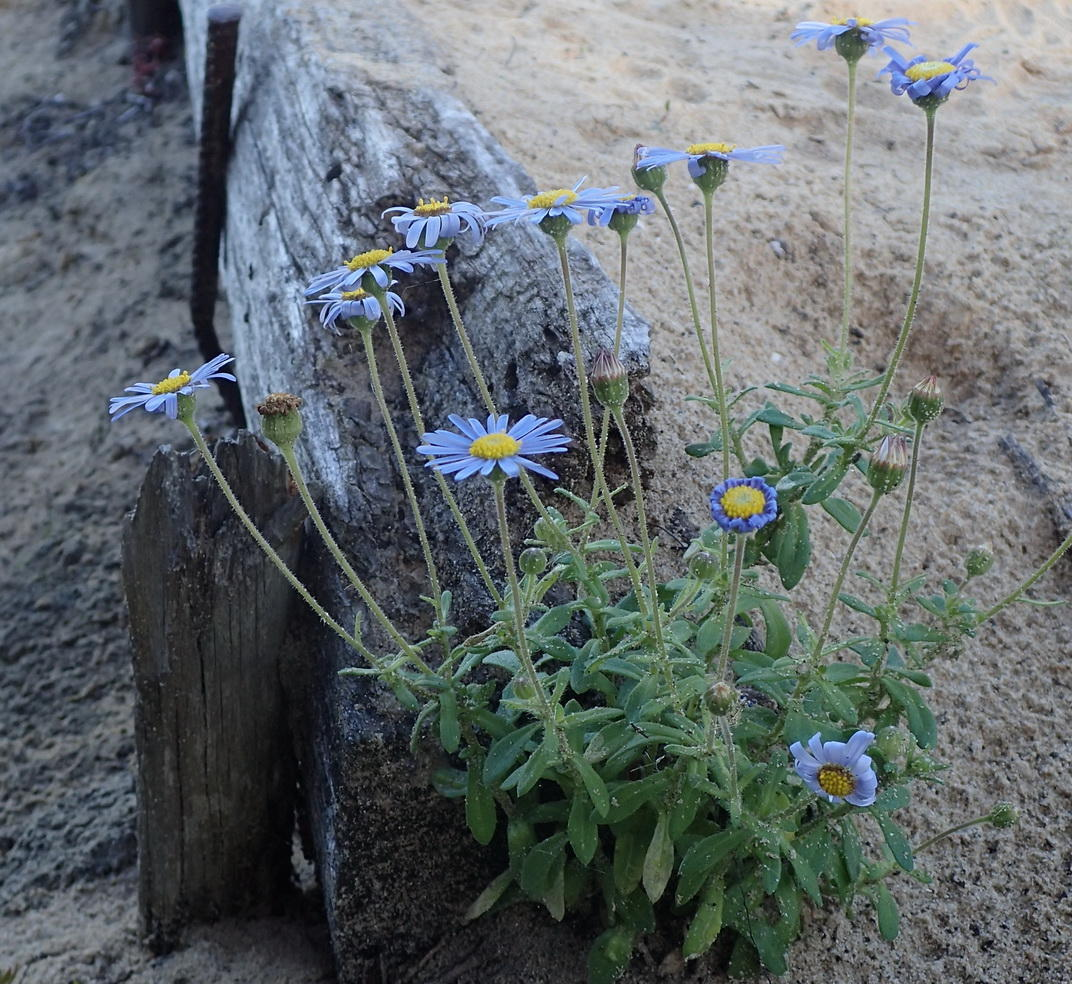
- section Neodetris: Felicia amoena↑ section Felicia: Felicia muricata↓
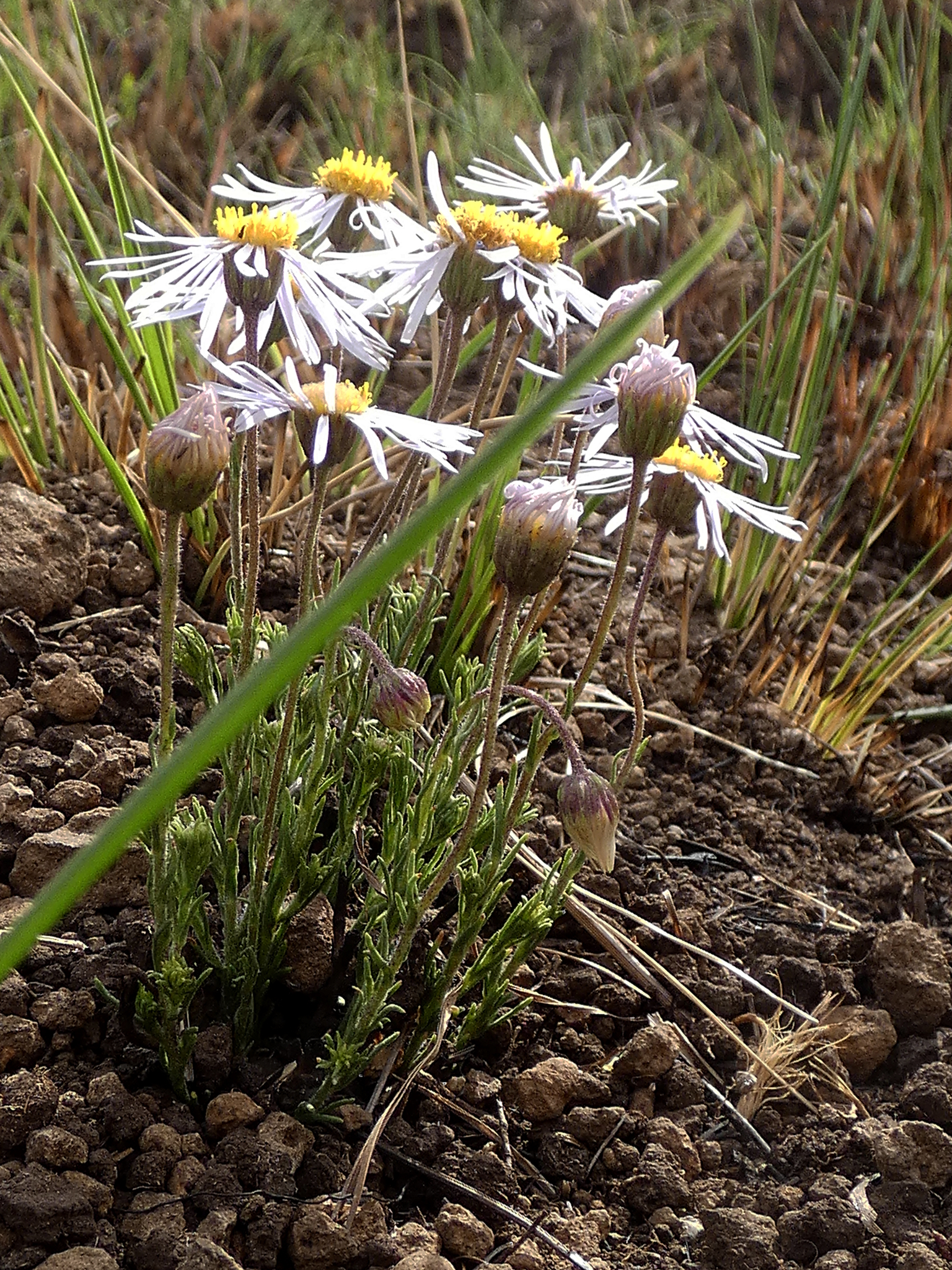

Scientific classification
- Kingdom: Plantae
- Clade: Tracheophytes
- Clade: Angiosperms
- Clade: Eudicots
- Clade: Asterids
- Order: Asterales
- Family: Asteraceae
- Subfamily: Asteroideae
- Tribe: Astereae
- Subtribe: Homochrominae
- Genus: Felicia; Cass.

Type species
- Felicia tenella (L.) Nees

Synonyms
- Charieis Cass.; Detris Adans.; Kaulfussia Nees; Munychia Cass.; Elphegea Less.; Detridium Nees; Agathaea Cass.; Asterosperma Less.; Fresenia DC.

= Felicia (plant) =

Genus of shrublets, perennials and annuals in the daisy family

Felicia is a genus of small shrubs, perennial or annual herbaceous plants, with 85 known species, that is assigned to the daisy family (Compositae or Asteraceae). Like in almost all Asteraceae, the individual flowers are 5-merous, small, and clustered in typical heads, which are surrounded by an involucre of between two and four whorls of bracts. In Felicia, the centre of the head is taken by yellow, seldom whitish or blackish blue disc florets, and is almost always surrounded by one single whorl of mostly purple, sometimes blue, pink, white, or yellow ligulate florets, and rarely, ligulate florets are absent. These florets sit on a common base (or receptacle) and are not individually subtended by a bract (or palea). Most species occur in the Cape Floristic Region, which is probably the area where the genus originates and had most of its development. Some species can be found in the eastern half of Africa, up to Sudan and the south-western Arabian Peninsula, while on the west coast, species can be found from the Cape to Angola, with one species having outposts on the Cameroon-Nigeria border and central Nigeria. Some species of Felicia are cultivated as ornamentals, and several hybrids have been developed for that purpose.

== Taxonomy ==
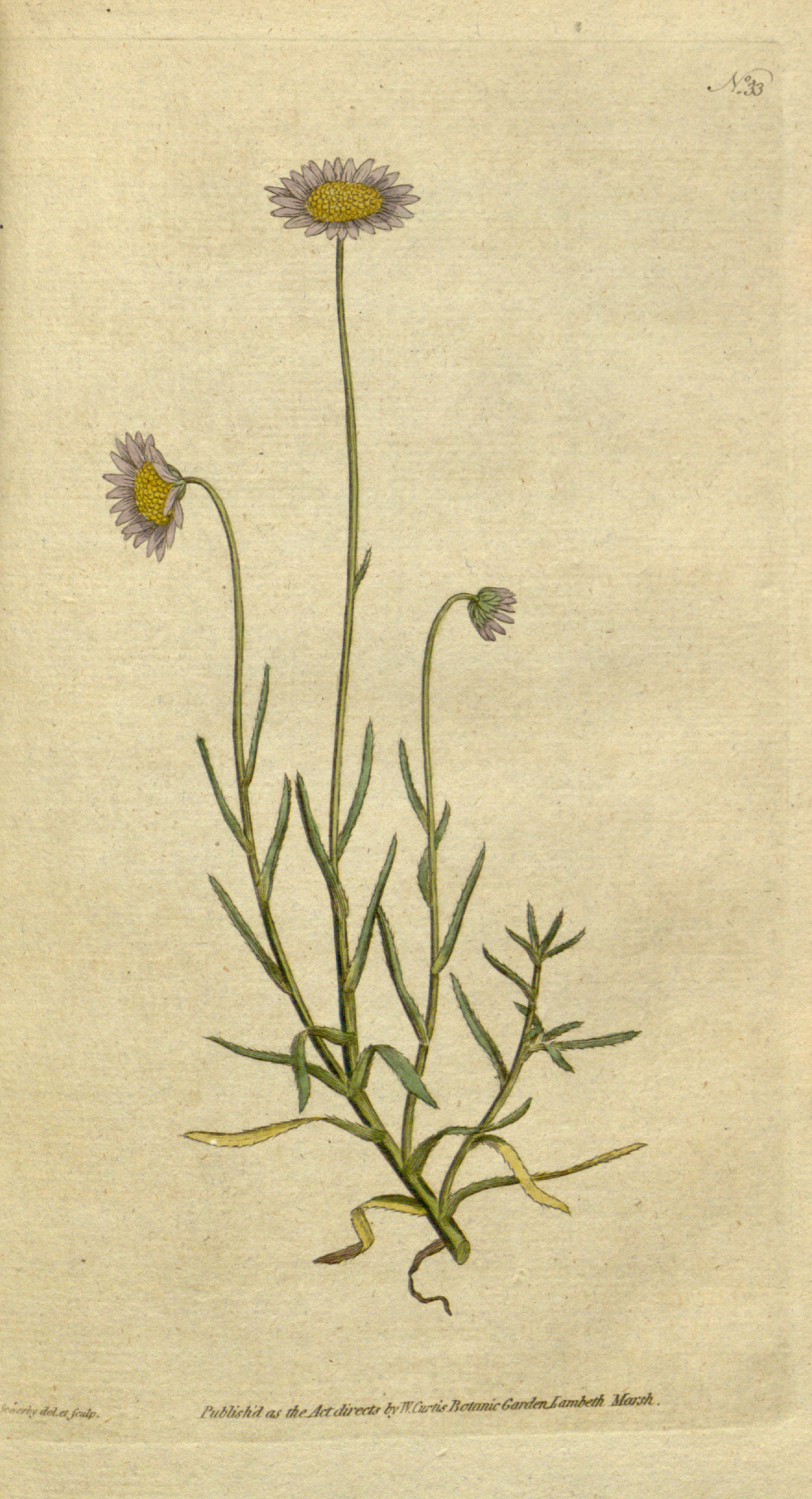
An early illustration of Aster tenellus in The Botanical Magazine, Volume 1, Plate 33 (presumedly published in 1787)

Aster tenellus, discovered by the early English botanist Leonard Plukenet in 1692, was the first species recorded that is now included in the genus Felicia (as F. tenella). This was followed in 1700 by Aster fruticosus, again by Plukenet, repeated by Caspar Commelin in 1701, a species now called Felicia fruticosa. Such names published before 1753, the year that was chosen as a starting point for the binomial nomenclature proposed by Carl Linnaeus, are not valid. In 1761, John Hill suggested the genus Coelestina, widely considered a later synonym of Ageratum, but the plant that was illustrated is most likely the same species as F. amelloides. In 1763, Carl Linnaeus described Cineraria amelloides (F. amelloides), the first valid name for a species assigned today to Felicia. In 1763, French botanist Michel Adanson described a new genus, Detris, without mentioning a species, but apparently having F. amelloides in mind. Peter Jonas Bergius, a botanist from Sweden, described Aster hyssopifolius in 1767, now known as F. hyssopifolia. A year later, Dutch botanist Pieter Burman the Younger added Aster aethiopicus (now F. aethiopica). This was followed by Aster cymbalariae (William Aiton, 1789), Leysseria ovata and Pteronia echinata (Carl Peter Thunberg, 1800 and 1823), Aster filifolius (Étienne Pierre Ventenat, 1804), and Cineraria bergeriana (Kurt Polycarp Joachim Sprengel, 1826), now F. cymbalariae, F. ovata, F. echinata, F. filifolius and F. bergeriana.

In 1815, French Asteraceae specialist Henri Cassini begun his work to rearrange the genera of the Asteraceae, splitting off species that had been assigned to Aster up till that moment but are now accepted in Felicia, starting with Agatacha. This name was probably a typographical error, since he replaced it with Agathaea in the following year. In 1817 he created Charieis, and followed up with Felicia in 1818. He created Munychia in 1825 to accommodate Aster cymbalariae. Of the species he assigned to his new genus, Diplopappus (1819), none are currently included in Felicia. At that moment, 17 species currently included in Felicia were known to science.

Because of the extensive collecting in the Cape Region by Drège, Ecklon and Zeyher, during the next decade, the number of known species expanded rapidly. In 1832, Christian Friedrich Lessing moved most of the species that Cassini distributed over his new genera back to Aster, although he assigned Cineraria bergerana to Elphegea, and created the new combinations Diplopappus fruticosa and D. filifolia. A year later, Nees von Esenbeck considered the assignment of current Felicia species. He thought Charieis was synonymous to the older genus Kaulfussia, agreed mostly with the split created by Cassini, includes the species of the section Lignofelicia in Diplostephium (Kunth, 1820), and created the genus Detridium for Cineraria bergerana. Augustin Pyramus de Candolle in 1836 recognised Agathaea, Diplopappus, Felicia and Munychia, altogether 49 species, most of which are assigned to Felicia today. Consecutive authors can roughly be divided into lumpers, who brought together many species in Aster, and splitters, who proposed narrow taxa; both groups eventually converged on Felicia in its current circumscription. Jürke Grau revised the genus in 1973 and described seventeen new species (F. alba, F. caespitosa, F. canaliculata, F. clavipilosa, F. comptonii, F. joubertinae, F. merxmuellerii, F. microcephala, F. monocephala, F. nigrescens, F. nordenstamii, F. oleosa, F. stenophylla and F. tsitsikamae), alongside eight new subspecies. Only four species have been described since: F. flava by Henk Jaap Beentje (1999), F. martinsiana (2007) by Santiago Ortiz, F. josephinae (2002) by John Manning and Peter Goldblatt, and F. douglasii in 2018 by Manning, Anthony Maggee and James Boatwright. Currently, 85 species have been assigned to Felicia.

Although Felicia has been commonly used for a long time, it is not the oldest name. In principle, Detris, as the earliest name, should have priority, but it was suppressed in favour of the widely used name Felicia. In 2010, it was proposed to also conserve Felicia over Agathaea, Charieis and Coelestina, because these names also precede Felicia and should get priority otherwise.

=== Naming ===
The genus is presumed to be named in honor of Fortunato Bartolomeo de Felice, an Italian-Swiss scientist.

=== Subdivision ===
The genus Felicia is divided into six groups called sections. These are Anhebecarpaea, Dracontium, Felicia, Lignofelicia, Longistylis and Neodetris. F. douglasii has not yet been assigned to any section.

The following taxa are assigned to the respective sections:

- Anhebecarpaea: F. echinata (type), F. nordenstamii, F. westae.
- Dracontium: F. rosulata (type), F. wrightii, F. quinquenervia, F. monocephala.
- Felicia: F. tenella (type), F. abyssinica, F. australis, F. bechuanica, F. cana, F. caespitosa, F. clavipilosa, F. comptonii, F. drakensbergensis, F. dentata, F. deserti, F. erigeroides, F. fascicularis, F. ferulacea, F. hirta, F. hirsuta, F. hyssopifolia, F. linearis, F. microcephala, F. microsperma, F. mossamedensis, F. muricata, F. nigrescens, F. ovata, F. serrata, F. uliginosa, F. venusta, F. zeyheri.
- Lignofelicia: F. fruticosa (type), F. brevifolia, F. burkei, F. canaliculata, F. dregei, F. esterhuyseniae, F. filifolia, F. gunillae, F. lasiocarpa, F. macrorrhiza, F. odorata, F. oleosa, F. rogersii, F. scabrida, F. whitehillensis.
- Longistylus: F. welwitschii (type), F. alba, F. anthemidodes, F. boehmii, F. grantii, F. smaragdina.
- Neodetris: F. amelloides (type), F. aculeata, F. aethiopica, F. amoena, F. annectens, F. bellidioides, F. bergeriana, F. cymbalariae, F. cymbalarioides, F. denticulata, F. diffusa, F. dubia, F. ebracteata, F. elongata, F. flanaganii, F. flava, F. heterophylla, F. hispida, F. josephinae, F. joubertinae, F. linifolia, F. martinsiana, F. merxmuelleri, F. minima, F. namaquana, F. petiolata, F. puberula, F. stenophylla, F. tenera, F. tsitsikame.

=== Phylogeny ===
According to recent DNA-analysis, Felicia belongs to the tribe Asterinae. It is probably polyphyletic.

=== Reassigned species ===
The species that were originally described as, or moved to Felicia or one of its synonyms, but have since been reassigned, include the following:

- Agathaea leiocarpa = Mairia sp.
- Elphegea reflexa = Polyarrhena reflexa
- Aster caffrorum (= F. caffrorum) = Microglossa caffrorum
- F. cameronii = Helicia sp.
- F. ciliaris = Gymnostephium ciliare
- F. ericifolia = Macowania ericifolia
- F. ficoidea = to be assigned to the Heliantheae
- F. kraussii = Gymnostephium ciliare
- F. imbricata = Polyarrhena imbricata
- F. lasiocarpa = Zyrphelis lasiocarpa
- F. maritima = to be assigned to the Heliantheae
- F. monticola = Zyrphelis monticola
- F. pinnatifida = Aster erucifolius
- F. reflexa = Polyarrhena reflexa
- F. retorta = Senecio retortus
- F. rigidula = Chrysocoma rigidula
- Fresenia pinnatilobata = Pegolettia pinnatilobata
- Fresenia foliosa = Pegolettia retrofracta

== Description ==
The base number of chromosomes of the earliest common ancestor of Felicia is probably nine, with most species diploid (2n=18), but some taxa in the section Felicia are tetraploid (4n=36), such as F. clavipilosa subsp. transvaalensis, F. fascicularis, and F. uliginosa. Divergent base chromosome numbers occur in the derived section Neodetris, with eight (2n=16) in F. amoena and F. elongata, six (2n=12) in F. minima and five (2n=10) in F. heterophylla, F. merxmuelleri and F. namaquana.

About 60% of the species currently assigned to Felicia are shrubs, 15–60 cm (5.9–23.6 in) high, very rarely up to 2 m (6.6 ft), most of which belong to the sections Lignofelicia, Anhebecarpaea and Felicia. 20% are herbaceous perennials, which are often in the sections Dracontium and Neodetris. Another 20% consists of annuals, many of which are assigned to the section Neodetris, while Longistylis is entirely made up of annual species. All the woody, and most herbaceous, species are well-branched and bear many flowerheads, while the section Dracontium is rich in species, with a leaf rosette and stems topped by a single head. Stressed specimens of annual Felicia species can sometimes have only one flower head per plant. Two related species in the section Neodetris, growing on vertical rock faces, have a pendulous habit: F. petiolata and F. flanaganii.

Vegetative reproduction is rare, but rhizomes occur in F. tenella, F. wrightii, F. amoena and more or less in F. uliginosa. A special type of vegetative reproduction can be found in F. fascicularis that has branches, which produce roots when in contact with soil. Several species develop short and long shoots, the combination of which creates a particular, well-recognisable habit in many species belonging to the sections Lignofelicia and Felicia. All types of unbranched hairs may be found within the genus, including glandular hairs. Felicia has resin ducts.

=== Leaves ===
Leaves are mostly alternately set along the stem, but opposite leaves do also occur, most prevalent in the section Neodetris, while in the section Longistylus, many species have opposite leaves in lower parts of the stem and alternately set leaves nearer to the top. Species in the sections Lignofelicia, Anhebecarpaea and Dracontium never have opposite leaves. Leaves are not compounded, and mostly have an entire margin, although in all sections but Anhebecarpaea, some species have leaves with up to moderate size teeth. Further incised leaves are restricted to F. brevifolia and its close relatives in section Lignofelicia. Leaves are generally seated, and their foot may be widened, particularly when these are succulent. Leaves in other species assigned to Lignofelicia may be digit-shaped, not having a recognisable margin. Species with stalked leaves are rare and restricted to the sections Felicia and Neodetris. Each leaf has between one and five primary veins, a number that is directly linked with the width of the leaf blade, and varies on the same plant. Leaves vary in consistency between species from soft to leathery. Resin canals are common in leaves of species of the sections Lignofelicia, Anhebecarpaea and Felicia, but do not occur in the other sections.

Most species have leaves with at least some hairs. Only F. dentata subsp. nubica, F. filifolia, F. fruticosa and F. whitehillensis, and some forms of F. muricata, are fully glabrous. On the other end of the spectrum, species in the section Neodetris are particularly hairy. Margins are often more hairy than the rest of the surface, which generally has a cartilageous seam or carries fine stiff bristle-like teeth.

=== Flowerhead ===
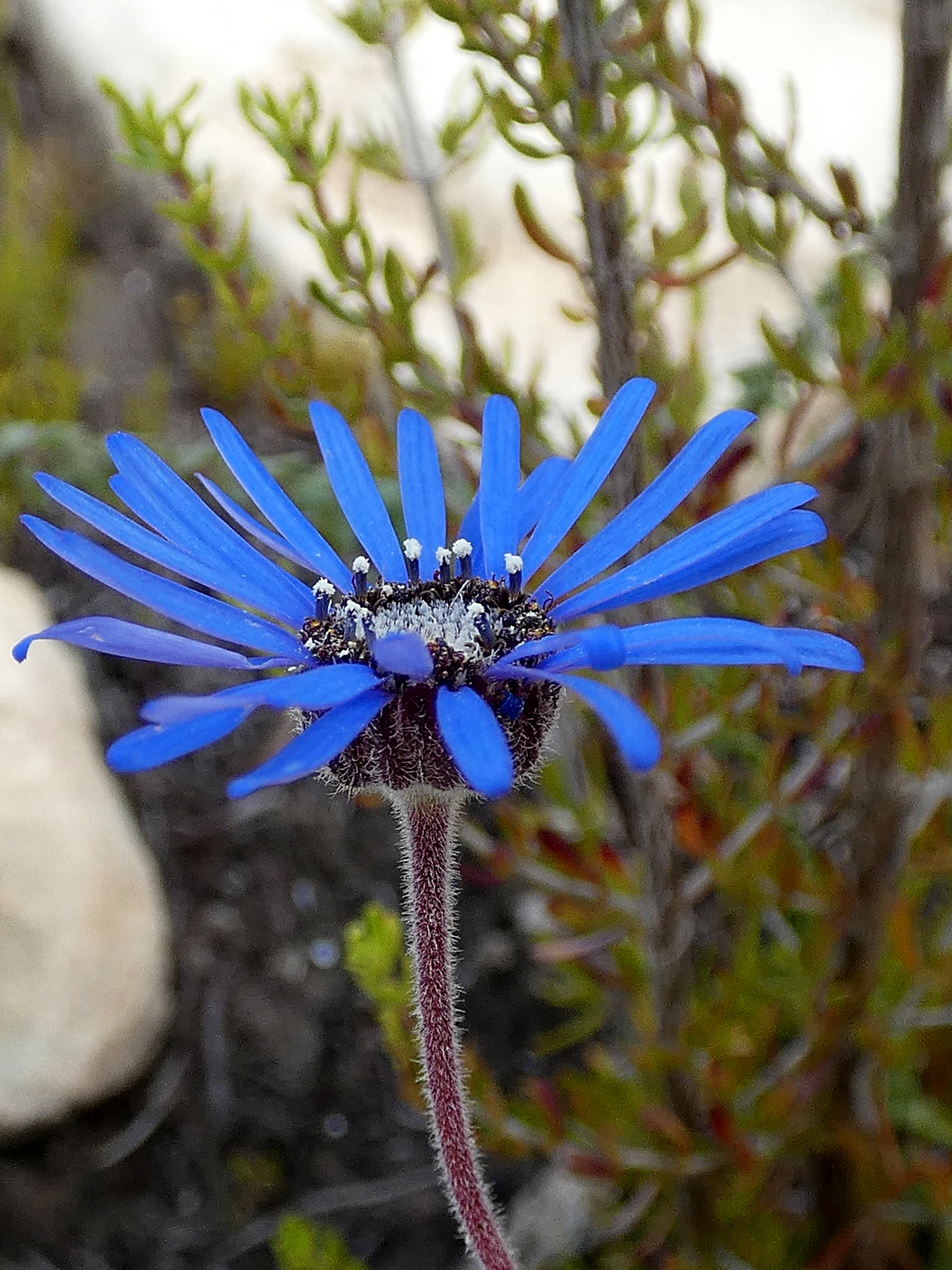
F. amoena subsp. latifolia, is a taxon which sometimes has a blue disc, but yellow discs are more common

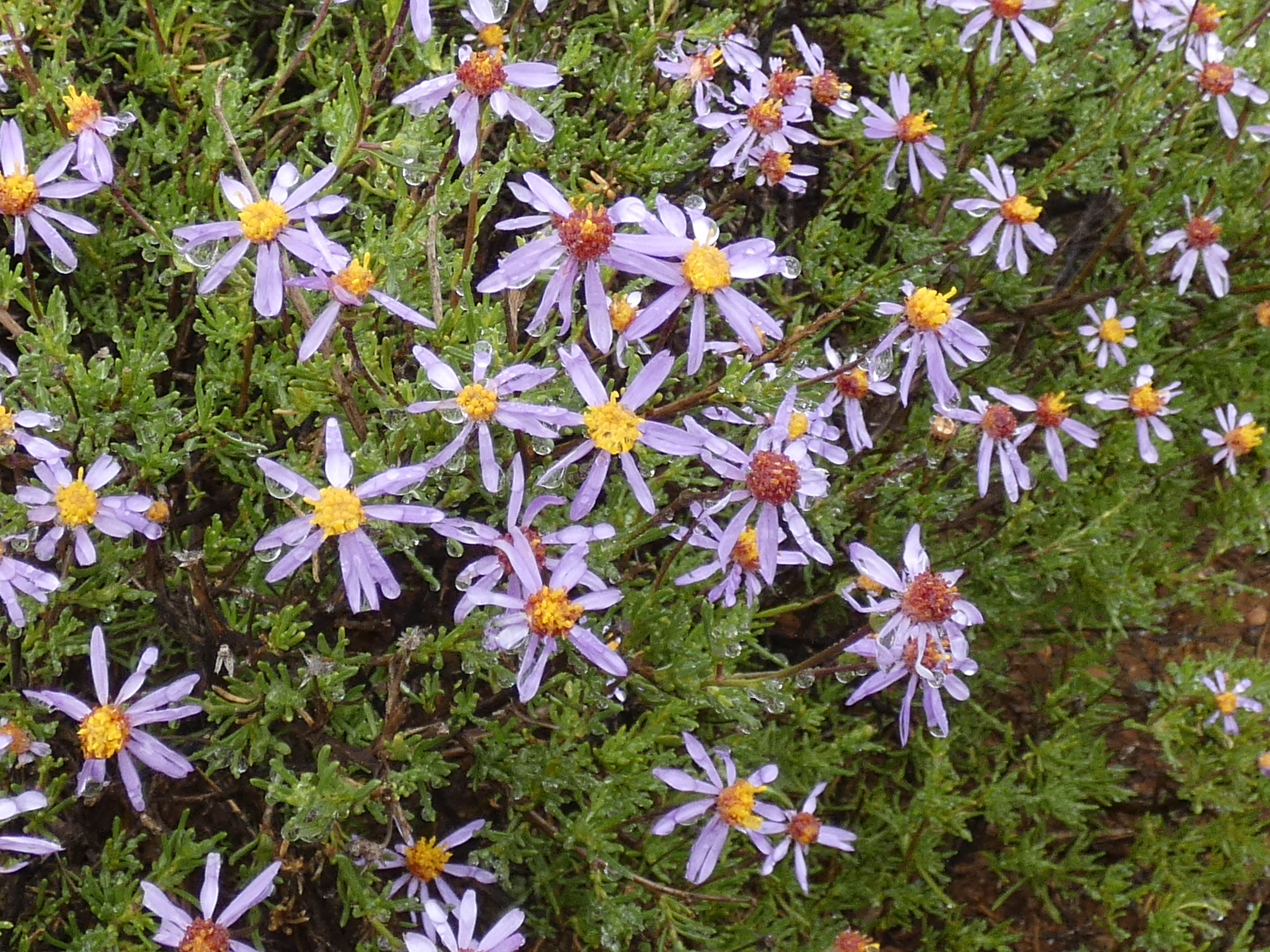
Felicia filifolia, showing disc florets turning pinkish brown when aging

The flowerheads have two rows of involucral bracts in almost all species of the section Neodetris (the exceptions being F. cymbalariae, F. denticulata, F. dubia and F. tenera), while the rest of the species have three or four rows of bracts. The communal base (or receptacle) on which the individual florets are implanted is lightly convex and lacks a receptacular bract (or palea) at the foot of each floret. Almost always, one row of female ligulate florets surrounds a centre of several rows of bisexual disc florets. Ligulate florets are sometimes absent in several taxa belonging to the section Lignofelicia (F. filifolia subsp. bodkinii, F. whitehillensis), and, in F. macrorrhiza, ligulate florets are never present. This is also true for F. ferulacea of the section Felicia. Ligulate florets are mostly bluish purple, particularly in the sections Lignofelicia, Anhebecarpaea and Felicia. In the section Dracontium, the color of the ligulate florets ranges from pale to middle blue, while in the section Neodetris, the range of bluish colors is even larger. In these two sections, the color is never purplish. Yellowish ligulate florets are restricted to F. mossamedensis and some species in the section Longistylis. In herbarium specimens, colors may change even when dried professionally, such as from bright yellow to green in the aptly named F. smaragdina, from yolk yellow to bright yellow in F. bohmii, and from white to pink in F. welwitschii. Some species across the sections have white ligulate florets, and specimens with white florets occur in many species that usually have bluish ligulate florets. The tube of the florets is often densely set with glandular hairs. Disc florets are yellow when young, and may become reddish later. Few annual species have whitish to dark blue discs, such as F. heterophylla, F. josephinae, and a form of F. amoena subsp. latifolia.

=== Fruit ===
As in all Asteraceae, the fruit does not open and only one of the compartments contains a single seed. The top of this so-called cypsela is ornamented, with a single row of around thirty hair-shaped, 2–10 mm (0.079–0.394 in) long, pappus bristles. There are approximately ten bristles in F. bergerana and six to eight in F. annectens. An individual bristle hair consists of many cells and has few to many teeth along its margins. Pappus is particularly long in the section Lignofelicia, such as in F. comptonii, F. heterophylla, F. ovata, F. venusta and F. welwitschii. In this section, the long hair is often interspersed with short scales. F. bechuanica and F. dentata (section Felicia) also have conspicuous short scales. Pappus with long barbes nearer to the base and shorter teeth nearer to the top occur in F. tenella and the section Longistylus. A glabrous base and teeth higher up the pappus occurs in the sections Dracontium and Neodetris. The tip of the pappus hair is wider in F. echinata and species in the section Lignofelicia, but mostly ends pointy. In fresh plants, the pappus is mostly white to bone-colored, sometimes yellowish, yellow-brown in F. dentata, although, in herbarium specimens, stronger colors may develop, such as fox-red in F. burkei. Fertilised and fully ripe cypselas may be 1–5 mm (0.039–0.197 in) long, dependent on the species. The color varies from yellow-brown (sections Lignofelicia and Longistylus), red-brown (Anhebecarpaea), dark brown (Dracontium), black (Neodetris), while species of the section Felicia may either be red-brown, dark brown or black. F. ovata has blackish green cypselas. They are ovate to elliptic, flattened, have two extending vascular bundles and are often covered in non-glandular hairs, characteristics that set Felicia apart from related genera, like Aster. Cypsela hairs in Felicia have a split tip, such as is common among other related genera. The shaft of the hair consists of two parallel series of long cells that are attached to a foot that consist of two short basal cells. When dry, there is a bend joint between the foot and the shaft so that it points up, and the hair is more or less pressed against the cypsela. When wet, the joint stretches and the hairs become erect. The cypsela hairs are mostly of uniform thickness, around 0.2 mm (0.0079 in) long, with a short cleft, but some, such as F. anthemidodes, have very short hairs, while others, such as in the section Lignofelicia, have languid, silky hairs of up to 2 mm (0.079 in) long. Hairs at the base of the cypsela and on the vascular bundles are often different from the rest. The tip of the hair may be more heavy, making the split tip reminiscent of a set of horns, such as in F. ovata, or the split may not be fully executed, such as in the sections Felicia and Neodetris, and the tip may be bullit-like with a furrow, such as in F. clavipilosa.

=== Sections ===
==== Anhebecarpaea ====
The three species belonging to the section Anhebecarpaea are erect shrublets with overlapping, initially hairy leaves, large heads with hairless purplish ligulate florets and yellow disc florets, set at the tip of the stems in umbel-like inflorescences. The pappus bristles are all equal in length, firm, indehiscent and are set with many teeth, and the cypselas are yellow- to red-brown. Those belonging to the ligulate florets are hairless and those of the disc florets have short bristles. The three species are endemic to coastal areas of the Western and Eastern Cape.

==== Dracontium ====
Species assigned to the section Dracontium are erect perennial herbs, with large leaves in a rosette at ground level and smaller bracts along a not or rarely shyly branched stem that carries one to four large heads with blue ligulate florets and yellow disc florets that are encircled by an involucre consisting of three whorls of approximately equal sized bracts. The cypselas are brown, topped with one row of firm indehiscent pappus hairs and covered in short hairs. There are four species that are all restricted to the Drakensberg Mountains.

==== Felicia ====
The taxa in the section Felicia may be woody shrublets or annual herbs, almost always with fully alternately set, thin to succulent, mostly narrow, variably hairy leaves, and many to few heads, always with ligulate florets, that are purple to white or seldom yellow, and yellow disc florets that may turn reddish when aging, each head encircled by an involucre of three to four whorls of overlapping bracts with resin ducts, the outer bracts clearly smaller. Short, triangular style braches are entirely set with papillae. Cypselas are crowned with one row of soft, equal length, more or less dehiscent pappus hairs, and its surface initially has very short hairs, later often without. The twenty eight species and several subspecies occur in southern Africa, but are concentrated in the south-western Cape.

==== Lignofelicia ====
The taxa that are included in the section Lignofelicia are erect, richly branching shrublets or low shrubs, with more or less succulent, mostly hairless (rarely set with simple hairs or glandular hairs), though always with a tuft of wooly hairs in the axils. Branches carry many small heads in the axils and at their tips, which consist of violet ligulate florets, or these may rarely be absent, and yellow disc florets, which may turn reddish with age. These are encircled by an involucre of four whorls of bracts containing resin ducts, the outer ones smallest. The relatively large cypselas are crowned with a row of indehiscent teethed hairs of unequal length, and carry long silky hair on their surface. Most of the fifteen species occur in the south and southwestern Cape, few occur in other parts of South Africa, and one also occurs in Namibia.

==== Longistylus ====
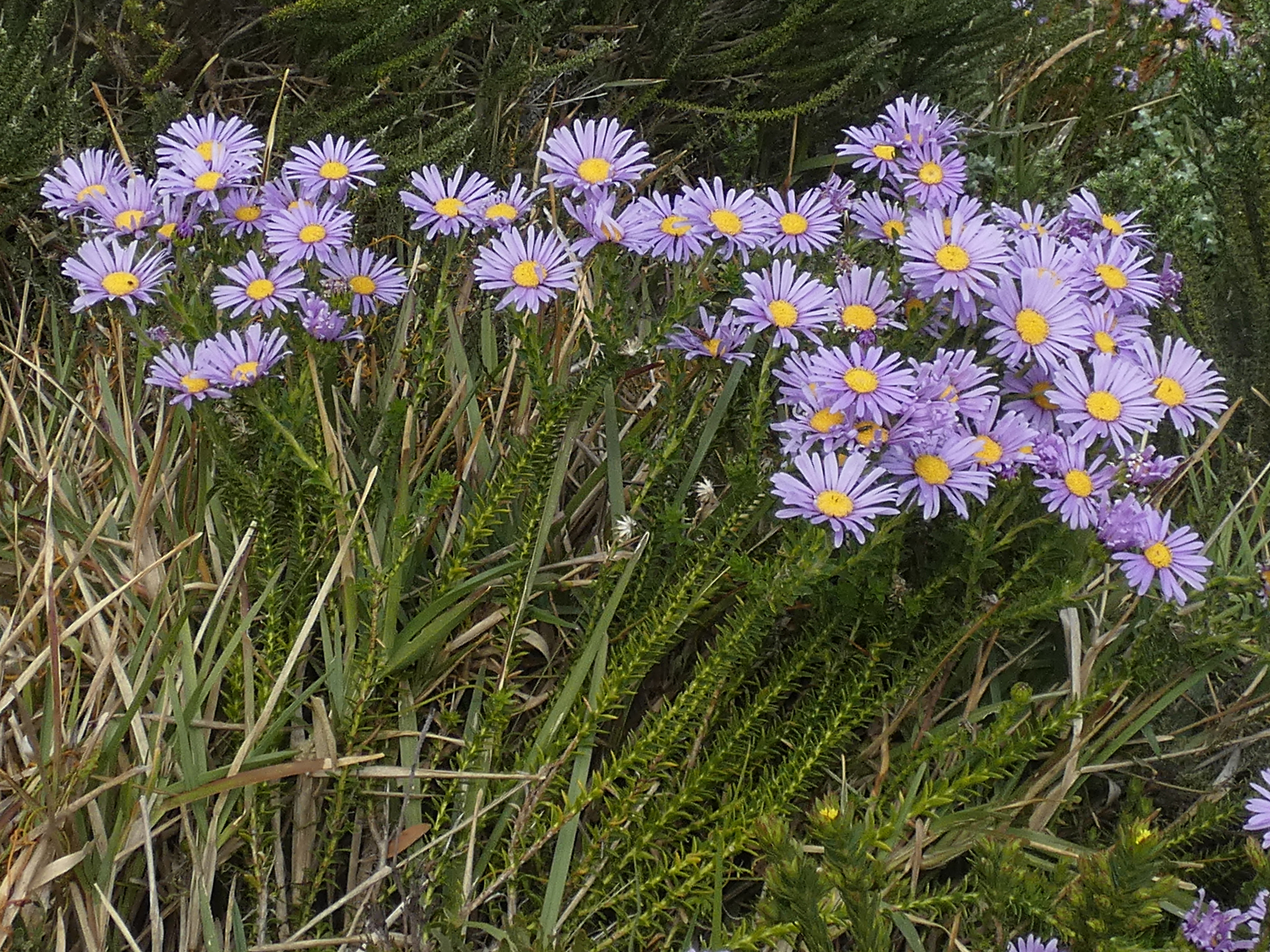
Felicia echinata

The section Longistylus consists of erect, branching, annual or biennial plants with oppositely set leaves lower and alternately set leaves nearer the top, both types hairy, lancet-shaped, with entire or toothed margins. Stems carry many small heads with white or yellow ligulate florets and yellow disc florets, surrounded by an involucre of four whorls of bracts. The small cypselas are crowned by pappus that consists of dehiscent, almost feathery bristles. The six species can be found from Namibia to southern Angola, and Zimbabwe through Malawi to Uganda.

==== Neodetris ====
The species of the section Neodetris are erect, rarely creeping or hanging annual or perennial herbs or shrubs, mostly with flat, hairy leaves with an entire margin, sometimes with teeth and rarely with hairless or succulent leaves. The flower heads are small to relatively big, with blue or white, sometimes violet ligulate florets and yellow, very rarely reddish brown or dark blue, disc florets encircled by an involucre of two whorls of bracts. The pappus that crowns the brown to black, medium size, shortly haired cypselas is mostly dehiscent, and pappus is absent in the ligulate florets. The 31 species are concentrated in the greater Cape area, extending from Lüderitz in Namibia to Durban.

=== Differences with related genera ===
Printzia has tailed anthers and blunt style branches that are only downy at their tips, while Felicia has tail-less anthers and pointy style branches that are downy over the entire length. Garuleum lacks bristles on its cypselas and has finely pinnate leaves, while Felicia has cypselas crowned by one row of hair-like bristles and mostly entire leaves, sometimes with deep cutting teeth. Amellus has pappus consisting of scales and bristles, while Felicia only has bristles. The species of Polyarrhena have a strong likeness to the species of Felicia section Anhebecarpaea, but have bisexual ligulate florets, that are white and have a pink wash on the outer surface, and male or fully infertile disc florets, while, in the section Anhebecarpaea, ligulate florets are female and blue-purple in color and the disc florets are bisexual and do set seed.

== Habitat and ecology ==
Many taxa assigned to Felicia occur in fynbos and in the Karoo. Some are sand dune specialists, such as F. amelloides and F. amoena, while others prefer to grow on rocky substrate, like F. petiolata and others in the section Neodetris. The East African annuals can be found in Miombo woodland, while a few, such as F. uliginosa, strongly associate with wet habitats. Further taxa exemplified by F. muricata subsp. cinerascens and the annuals of Namibia are very drought resistant. The taxon density of Felicia reduces from the south-west to the north-east.

Felicia is pollinated by insects such as butterflies, wasps, and bees, and the flowers are also frequented by thrips. Yellow flower crab spiders sometimes use the central disc of the heads, where they are well camouflaged, and wait for insects to wander into their grasp.

Usually, nearly all florets set seed, the involucre will open outward when ripe, and the wind will carry away the easily detaching cypselas, thanks to the hairy pappus. The semiparasitic plant Thesium namaquense, also called poison bush, may infect at least two of the species, F. filifolia and F. muricata, and when these Felicias are browsed repeatedly by the same animal, this may cause poisoning, particularly in sheep.

== Conservation ==
For the taxa that occur in South Africa, the conservation status has been regarded.

- The survival of seventy nine species is of least concern: Felicia aculeata, F. aethiopica subsp. aethiopica, F. aethiopica subsp. ecklonis, F. amelloides, F. amoena subsp. amoena, F. amoena subsp. latifolia, F. amoena subsp. stricta, F. australis, F. bechuanica, F. bellidioides subsp. bellidioides, F. bellidioides subsp. foliata, F. bergeriana, F. brevifolia, F. burkei, F. caespitosa, F. cana, F. canaliculata, F. clavipilosa subsp. clavipilosa, F. clavipilosa subsp. transvaalensis, F. cymbalariae subsp. cymbalariae, F. cymbalariae subsp. ionops, F. denticulata, F. drakensbergensis, F. dregei, F. dubia, F. echinata, F. erigeroides, F. fascicularis, F. ferulácea, F. filifolia subsp. bodkinii, F. filifolia subsp. filifolia, F. filifolia subsp. schaeferi, F. filifolia subsp. schlechteri, F. flanaganii, F. fruticosa subsp. brevipedunculata, F. fruticosa subsp. fruticosa, F. heterophylla, F. hirsuta, F. hirta, F. hispida, F. hyssopifolia subsp. glabra, F. hyssopifolia subsp. hyssopifolia, F. hyssopifolia subsp. polyphylla, F. lasiocarpa, F. linearis, F. linifolia, F. macrorrhiza, F. merxmuelleri, F. microsperma, F. mínima, F. mossamedensis, F. muricata subsp. cinerascens, F. muricata subsp. muricata, F. muricata subsp. strictifolia, F. namaquana, F. odorata, F. ovata, F. petiolata, F. puberula, F. quinquenervia, F. rogersii, F. rosulata, F. scabrida, F. stenophylla, F. tenella subsp. cotuloides, F. tenella subsp. longifolia, F. tenella subsp. pusilla, F. tenella subsp. tenella, F. tenera, F. uliginosa, F. venusta, F. whitehillensis, F. zeyheri subsp. linifolia, F. zeyheri subsp. zeyheri.
- One species is considered near-threatened: Felicia nordenstamii.
- Four species are vulnerable: Felicia ebracteata, F. elongata, F. josephinae, F. tsitsikamae,
- Seven taxa are rare: Felicia comptonii, F. cymbalarioides, F. diffusa subsp. difusa, F. esterhuyseniae, F. microcephala, F. oleosa, F. serrata.
- Two taxa are categorised as critically rare: Felicia diffusa subsp. khamiesbergensis, F. wrightii.
- Two species are endangered: Felicia nigrescens, F. westae.
- Of three taxa, the conservation status cannot be determined because discriminating characters are insufficiently described or the taxonomical status is problematic: Felicia annectens, F. joubertinae subsp. glabrescens, F. joubertinae subsp. joubertinae.
- For one species insufficient information is available to determine its status: Felicia deserti.

Species or subspecies extending outside South Africa have robust populations that currently do not face the risk of global extinction, and are therefore classified as Least Concern.
