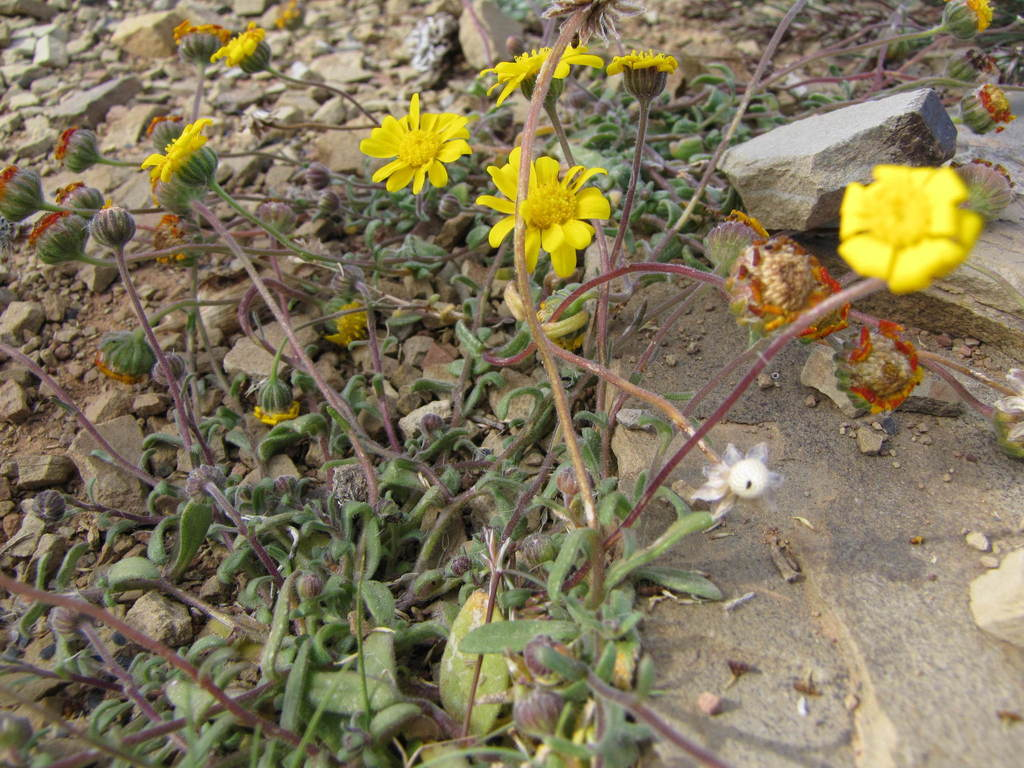

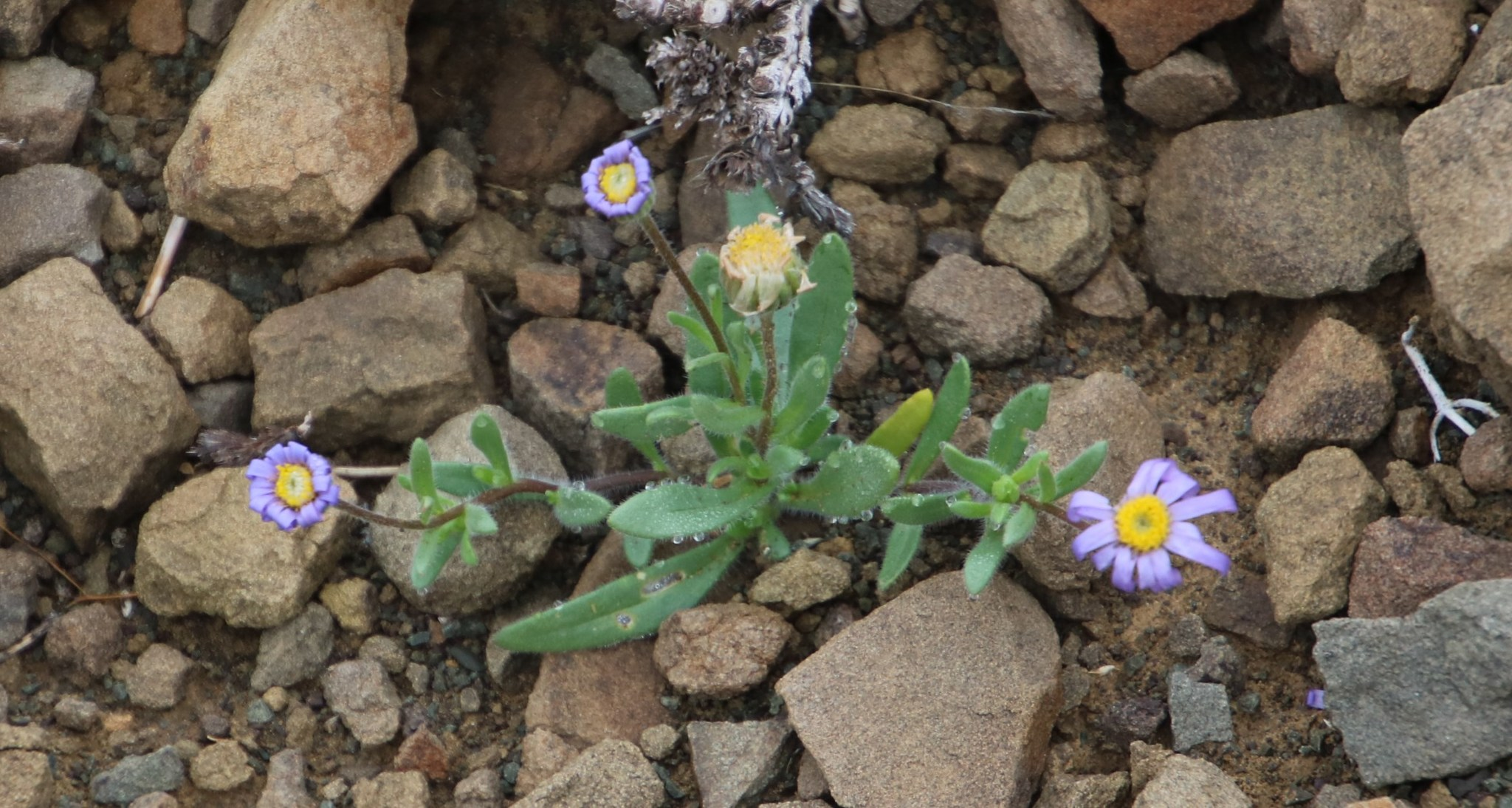

Scientific classification
- Kingdom: Plantae
- Clade: Tracheophytes
- Clade: Angiosperms
- Clade: Eudicots
- Clade: Asterids
- Order: Asterales
- Family: Asteraceae
- Genus: Felicia
- Section: Felicia sect. Neodetris
- Species: F. namaquana

Binomial name
- Felicia namaquana (Harv.) Merxm.

Synonyms
- Aster namaquanus; Aster elongatus var. candollei; Felicia schenckii; Felicia prageri; Susanna dinteri

= Felicia namaquana =

Annual plant in the daisy family from Namibia and South Africa

Felicia namaquana is a glandular-hairy, branching annual plant of up to 25 cm (10 in) high that is assigned to the family Asteraceae. It is sometimes called Bloublommetjie or pers poublom in Afrikaans. Flowering occurs between May and October. It grows in Namibia and South Africa.

== Description ==
Felicia namaquana is a glandular-hairy, robust, often strongly branching annual plant of up to 25 cm (10 in) high. The central branch is upright, but lateral branches start off outwards at base, bending upwards. The branches are thickly set with leaves, particularly near the base. The leaves are alternately arranged along the branches except for the basal pair, narrowly to broadly inverted lance-shaped, up to about 6 cm (2 2/5 in) long and 2–10 mm (0.08–0.4 in) wide, with a blunt tip, an entire margin, with one central vein, and a roughly and glandular hairy surface.

The firm and large flower heads sit individually on top of an almost leafless, hairy stalk of up to 10 cm (4 in) long. The involucre is about 1 cm (2/5 in) across, and consisting of two strict rows of equally long bracts. Those in the outer row are about 1 mm (0.04 in) wide, lance-shaped, roughly and glandular hairy with a fringe of hairs near the tip. Those in the inner row narrowly obovate, 1 1/2 mm wide, with a broad papery margin and eventually hairless. Many female ray florets with a light blue, rarely yellow, strap, are 2 cm (4/5 in) long and 2 1/2 mm (0.1 in) wide, with a hairy tube. Many bisexual, softly hairy disc florets with a yellow corolla of about 5 mm (1/5 in) long. In the center of each corolla are five anthers merged into a tube, through which the style grows when the floret opens, hoovering up the pollen on its shaft. At the tip of both style branches is a narrowly triangular appendage. Around the base of the corolla are many white pappus bristles with teeth, that are easily discarded. The dry, one-seeded, indehiscent fruits called cypselae are large, 3 mm (0.12 in) long and 1 1/2 mm (0.6 in) wide, inverted egg-shaped, yellowish brown to brown, with a strong marginal ridge, with thick, 1/2-1 mm (0.02–0.04 in) with short, robust hairs.

Felicia namaquana is a diploid having five sets of homologue chromosomes (2n=10).

== Taxonomy ==
Many scientific names have been given to this species because it is very variable. In 1865 William Henry Harvey, described both Aster namaquanus and Aster elongatus var. candollei. Karl August Otto Hoffmann described Felicia schenckii in 1898, J. Mattfeld added Felicia prageri in 1921, and Edwin Percy Phillips distinguished Susanna dinteri in 1950, all of them honoring the collector of the specimens described. In 1960, Hermann Merxmüller reassigned Harvey's species and made the new combination Felicia namaquana. In 1973 Jürke Grau considered all of these name synonymous. The species is considered to be part of the section Neodetris.

== Distribution ==
The pers poublom occurs in the wild from Namibia, through Bushmanland and Namaqualand, via Hantam to Worcester and extends eastwards into the Great Karoo. It grows on sandy or gravelly plains.

== Conservation ==
The continued survival of Felicia namaquana is considered to be of least concern because the population is stable.
