= Felicia gunillae =

Conservation status
- Least Concern (IUCN 3.1)

Scientific classification
- Kingdom: Plantae
- Clade: Tracheophytes
- Clade: Angiosperms
- Clade: Eudicots
- Clade: Asterids
- Order: Asterales
- Family: Asteraceae
- Genus: Felicia
- Section: Felicia sect. Lignofelicia
- Species: F. gunillae

Binomial name
- Felicia gunillae B.Nord.

Species of flowering plant

Felicia gunillae is a species of plant in the family Asteraceae that is endemic to Namibia.

== Distribution and habitat ==
F. gunillae is known only from two subpopulations growing on the west facing slope of Brandberg Mountain, below the summit at 2,000–2,650 m (6,560–8,690 ft) above sea level.

== Description ==
F. gunillae is a subshrub growing to 1.5 m (4 ft 11 in) tall. The stems are glandular and covered with coarse bristles. The leaves are spathulate to oblanceolate, measuring 10–20 mm (0.39–0.79 in) by 5–10 mm (0.20–0.39 in) with 5-7 large teeth along the edges. The leaves are arranged alternately and have large bristles underneath. The flowers are usually solitary, with strap-like ray florets that may be white, blue, or violet in colour.
