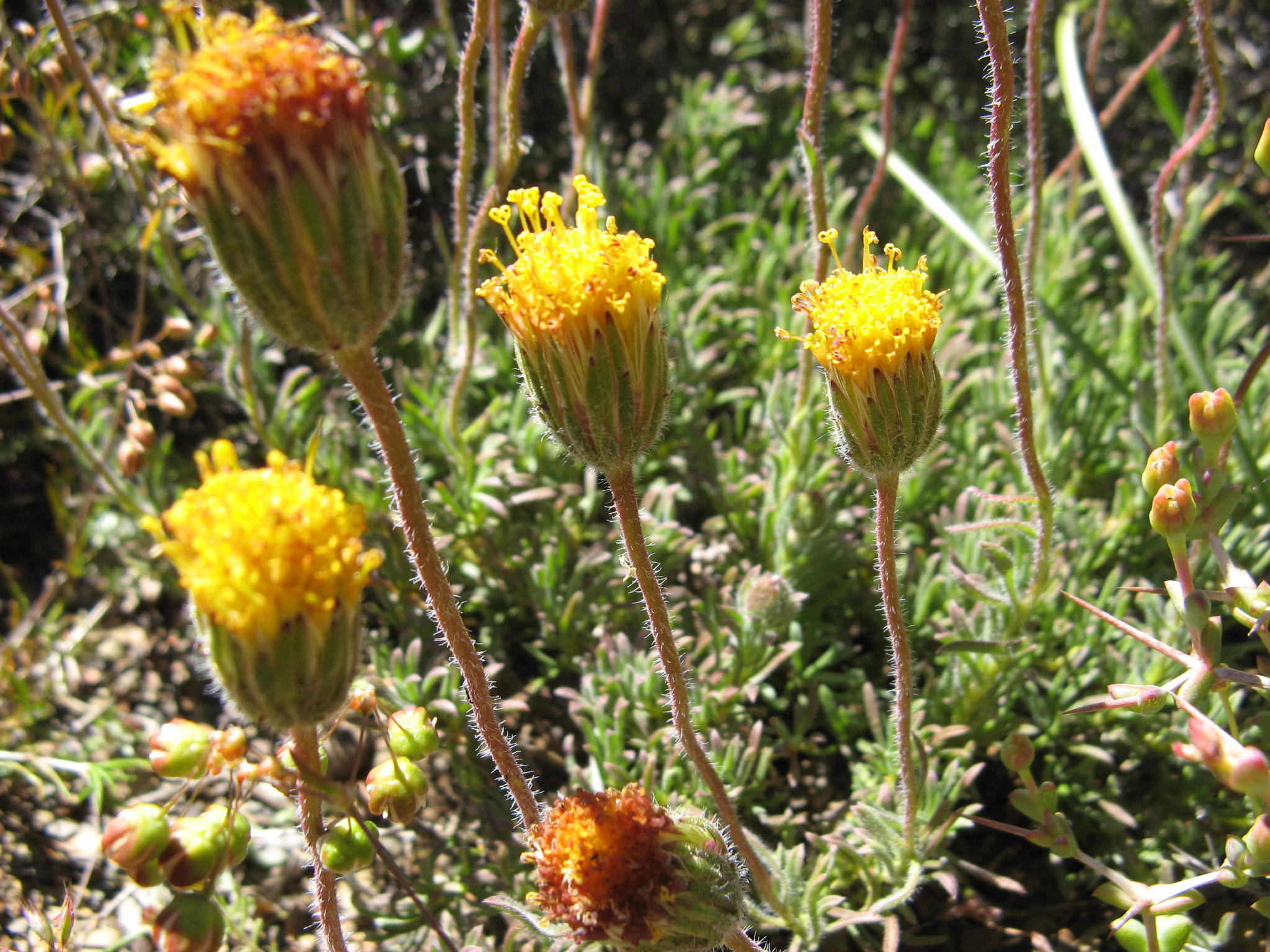

Scientific classification
- Kingdom: Plantae
- Clade: Tracheophytes
- Clade: Angiosperms
- Clade: Eudicots
- Clade: Asterids
- Order: Asterales
- Family: Asteraceae
- Genus: Felicia
- Section: Felicia sect. Lignofelicia
- Species: F. macrorrhiza

Binomial name
- Felicia macrorrhiza (Thunb.) DC.

Synonyms
- Aster macrorrhizus Thunb.; Fresenia scaposa DC.; Fresenia stuposa; Fresenia nana Hutch.

= Felicia macrorrhiza =

Shrublet in the daisy family from South Africa

Felicia macrorrhiza is a small, evergreen shrub in the family Asteraceae. This species grows in the Karoo region of South Africa. It is called Aspoestertjie in Afrikaans.

It is more or less strongly branched, growing up to 15 cm (6 in) high. It has narrow leaves, crowded on the younger stems, which leave a dry, persistent leaf base on older branches. The flower heads lack ray florets but contain many yellow disc florets.

== Description ==
Felicia macrorrhiza is an evergreen, more or less strongly branched dwarf shrub of up to 15 cm (6 in) high, with a strongly gnarled woody base. The branches are covered with gray brown bark and some long hairs. Older branches are densely set with persistent dry leaf bases, the younger ones with leaves. The leaves are alternately set, linear, sometimes spoon-shaped, more or less succulent, 1–2 1/2 cm long and 1–2 mm (0.039–0.079 in) wide, with up to 1 mm (0.039 in) wide, pale, ciliate margin, the inner base with long woolly hairs, evenly long-haired.

The large flower heads are set individually on top sparingly hairy, towards the top more densely hairy, up to 5 cm (2.0 in) long stalks with some small leaves along their lengths. The involucre is about 1 1/2 cm in diameter and consists of about four rows of lance-shaped, green, overlapping bracts, often with the margin tinged reddish, hardly papery and ciliate towards the tip. The outer involucral bracts are about 5 mm (1/5 in) long and 1 mm (0.039 in) wide with long hairs, the inner bracts 14 mm (0.55 in) long and 1 1/2 mm wide with fewer long hairs. The flower heads never have ray florets. There are many disc florets with a yellow corolla of up to 8 mm (1/3 in) long, in the center of each of these are five anthers merged into a tube, through which the style grows when the floret opens, hoovering up the pollen on its shaft. At the tip of both style branches is a triangular appendage. Around the base of the corolla are many yellowish white pappus bristles of two different lengths. The longer pappus bristles are about 9 mm (0.35 in) long, toothed, with a long pointy tip. The shorter pappus bristles are up to 1 1/2 mm long. Below the base of each corolla is a red-brown, dry, one-seeded, indehiscent fruit called cypsela that is about 5 mm (1/5 in) long and 2 mm (0.079 in) wide, inverted egg-shape in outline, with a slight ridge along the edge. The surface has few scales and long silky hairs, often with a narrow hairless zone bordering the edge.

Heads without ray florets also occur from time to time in related species of the section Lignofelicia, in particular F. whitehillensis, F. filifolia subsp. bodkinii and subsp. schaeferi.

== Taxonomy ==
This species of daisy was first described in 1800 by Carl Thunberg, who named it Aster macrorrhizus. In 1836, Augustin Pyramus de Candolle assigned Thunberg's type to the genus Felicia, so creating Felicia macrorrhiza. He also described another collection in the same publication, which he called Fresenia scaposa. When Ernst Gottlieb von Steudel accepted De Candole’s name, a printing error was made, and the name Fresenia stuposa was published in 1840. In 1917, John Hutchinson distinguished Fresenia nana. In 1973, Jürke Grau considered all these names synonymous to Felicia macrorrhiza. The species is considered part of the section Lignofelicia.

== Conservation ==
The continued survival of Felicia macrorrhiza is considered to be of least concern because its population is stable.
