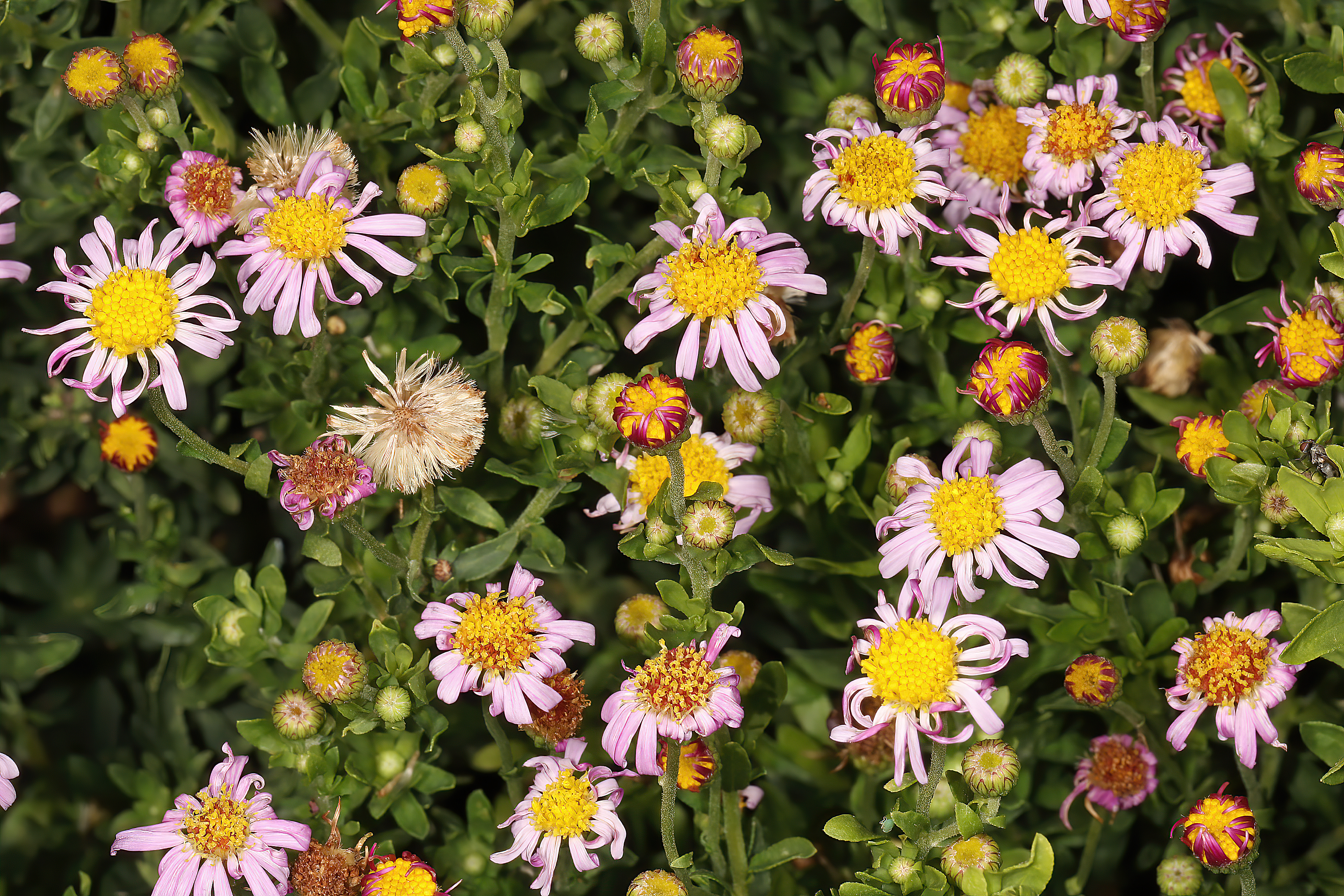
- Near Johannesburg

Scientific classification
- Kingdom: Plantae
- Clade: Tracheophytes
- Clade: Angiosperms
- Clade: Eudicots
- Clade: Asterids
- Order: Asterales
- Family: Asteraceae
- Genus: Felicia
- Section: Felicia sect. Felicia
- Species: F. erigeroides

Binomial name
- Felicia erigeroides DC.

Synonyms
- Aster erigeroides (DC.) Harv., nom. illeg.; Aster erigeroides var. schultesii Harv.; Aster erigeroides var. trinervius (Turcz.) Harv.; Felicia natalensis Sch.Bip. ex Walp.; Felicia trinervia Turcz.

= Felicia erigeroides =

Species of flowering plant

Felicia erigeroides, commonly known as wild Michaelmas daisy, isithelelo or ixhaphozi, is a species of flowering plant in the family Asteraceae native to South Africa, where it is found from Humansdorp in Eastern Cape Province to KwaZulu-Natal.

Felicia erigeroides was first described in 1836 by Augustin Pyramus de Candolle. Harvey reclassified it as Aster erigoides, but this was an illegitimate name.
