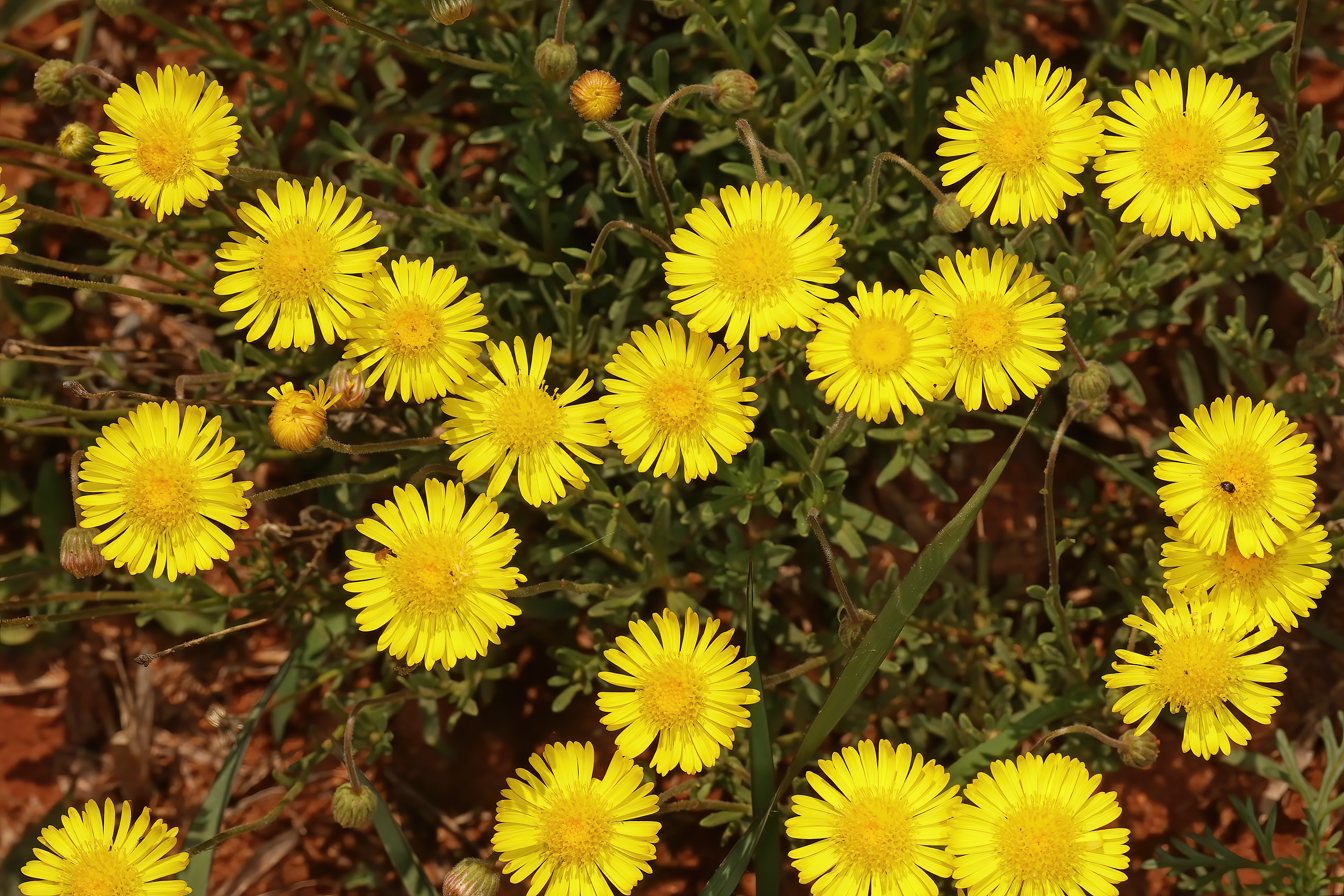

Scientific classification
- Kingdom: Plantae
- Clade: Tracheophytes
- Clade: Angiosperms
- Clade: Eudicots
- Clade: Asterids
- Order: Asterales
- Family: Asteraceae
- Genus: Felicia
- Section: Felicia sect. Felicia
- Species: F. mossamedensis

Binomial name
- Felicia mossamedensis (Hiern) Mendonça

Synonyms
- Detris mossamedensis; D. hyssopifolia var. straminea, F. hyssopifolia var. straminea; F. lutea, Aster luteus

= Felicia mossamedensis =

Plant in the daisy family from southern Africa

Felicia mossamedensis or yellow felicia is a well-branched, roughly hairy, annual or perennial plant of up to 30 cm (1 ft) high, assigned to the family Asteraceae. It has alternately arranged, seated, flat to slightly succulent, broad-based, entire, blunt tipped leaves. The flower heads sit individually on top of a stalk of up to 8 cm (3 in) long, have an involucre of three whorls of bracts, many yellow ray florets and many yellow disk florets. It can be found in southern Africa, in Zimbabwe, Mozambique, Botswana, Eswatini, South Africa and on the coast of Angola.

== Taxonomy ==
The yellow felicia was first described by William Philip Hiern in 1898, based on a collection made by the Austrian explorer and botanist Friedrich Welwitsch in 1859, between the town of Moçâmedes and the river Giraul in Angola. Hiern called it Detris mossamedensis. In the same publication, he also described a new variety of Detris hyssopifolia, that he named straminea, based on another 1859 collection by Welwitsch, now from Praja de Amelia near Moçâmedes. A specimen from near Amatikulu in Zululand, South Africa, collected by James Wylie in 1899, was described by Nicholas Edward Brown in 1901 as Felicia lutea. John Hutchington reassigned Brown's species to the genus Aster, creating the combination A. luteus in 1935. In 1943, Francisco de Ascensão Mendonça reassigned Detris mossamedensis to the genus Felicia, making the combination F. mossamedensis. Jürke Grau in his 1973 Revision of the genus Felicia, considered all these names synonyms. The species is considered to be part of the section Felicia.

The species name mossamedensis refers to the type location, the Moçâmedes District in Angola. It is called kgaba yaMatebele in the Tswana language.

== Description ==
The yellow felicia is a roughly hairy, annual or perennial plant of 7–30 cm (3–12 in) high, with a tough taproot that strongly branches from the foot, and is also often woody at the base. Its leaves are arranged alternately along the stems, lack a leaf stalk, have a single vein, a wide base, an entire margin and a blunt tip, are narrowly inverted lance-shaped to line-shaped in outline, 1 1/4–3 1/2 cm (0.5–1.4 in) long and 0.8–6 mm (0.03–0.24 in) wide. They are flat to slightly succulent, with perpendicular, broad-based bristles and often glandular.

The flower heads sit individually at the tip of an up to 8 cm (3 1/5 in) long inflorescence stalks, which are bristly and often glandular in its lower parts and eventually hairless near the top, and with some small scaly bracts. The greenish involucre that envelops the florets is up to 5 mm (0.20 in) in diameter, and consists of three whorls of overlapping bracts that are lance-shaped. The bracts in the outer whorl are bristly and glandular, about 3 mm (0.12 in) long and 1/2 mm (0.02 in) wide. The bracts in the middle whorl eventually become hairless, are about 5 1/2 mm (0.22 in) long and 1 mm (0.039 in) wide. The bracts in the innermost whorl are hairless to begin with, about 5 1/2 mm long and 1/2 mm (0.02 in) wide.

Along the margin of the flower head are many female ray florets that have yellow straps of about 7 mm (0.28 in) long and 1.2 mm (0.047 in) wide radiating out. In the center of the head are many yellow, bisexual disc florets of about 4 mm (0.16 in) long. In the center of the corolla of each disc floret are five anthers merged into a tube, through which the style grows when the floret opens, hoovering up the pollen on its shaft. The style in both ray- and disc florets forks, and at the tip of both style branches is a triangular appendage. Surrounding the base of the corolla are many white, deciduous pappus bristles of about 4 mm (0.16 in) long, that are strongly serrated near the base and weakly near the top. The eventually black, dry, one-seeded, indehiscent fruits called cypselae are inverted egg-shaped, about 2 mm (0.079 in) long and 1 mm (0.039 in) wide, with a prominent, light-coloured ridge along the margin, and with some scattered hairs along its surface.

It is a diploid with nine homologous pairs of chromosomes (2n=18).

=== Differences with related species ===
There are only few Felicia species with yellow ray florets. F. mossamedensis has alternately set, entire leaves, and a single medium-size flower head with an involucre of three whorls of bracts, at the tip of the inflorescence stalk. All other species with yellow ray florets have oppositely set leaves lower and alternately set leaves nearer the top, with entire or toothed margins. In all other species with yellow ray florets, the stems carry many, small heads, each surrounded by an involucre of four whorls of bracts.

== Distribution, habitat and conservation ==
Felicia mossamedensis occurs in western, central, southern, and eastern Zimbabwe, the Manica e Sofala, Gaza-Imhambane and Maputo provinces of Mozambique, Botswana, Eswatini, and the Limpopo, Gauteng, Mpumalanga and KwaZulu-Natal provinces of South Africa. There is also an isolated population in a narrow strip along the coast of Angola near Moçâmedes. Grau suggested that the species might have lifted a hike on a ship from Mozambique to Angola, both of which being former Portuguese colonies. In Zimbabwe it grows in shrubland, grassland and along roadsides up to an altitude of up to 1,900 m (6,200 ft). In South Africa, it is considered a least concern species.
