= Felicia wrightii =

Scientific classification
- Kingdom: Plantae
- Clade: Tracheophytes
- Clade: Angiosperms
- Clade: Eudicots
- Clade: Asterids
- Order: Asterales
- Family: Asteraceae
- Genus: Felicia
- Section: Felicia sect. Dracontium
- Species: F. wrightii

Binomial name
- Felicia wrightii Hilliard & B.L.Burtt

Perennial plant in the daisy family from South Africa

Felicia wrightii is a low, up to 20 cm (8 in) high, perennial, herbaceous plant with conspicuous basal leaf rosettes, and runners that end in rosettes. It has narrow bracts along the inflorescence stalks on top of which are individual flower heads with an involucre of three whorls of bracts, about sixteen ray florets with about 1 cm (1/2 in) long, pale blue straps, that encircle many yellow disc florets. No fertile seeds have been found, so this species may solely reproduce vegetatively. The species is only known from one location in the KwaZulu-Natal Drakensberg, where it grows on damp stream banks.

== Description ==
Felicia wrightii is a perennial plant, herbaceous plant, of up to 20 cm (8 in) high. Its leaf rosettes usually develop several, up to about 10 cm (4 in) long runners, at the end of which daughter rosettes appear. Most leaves are in a rosette, but smaller ones sit alternately on the stalk. The rosette leaves are elliptic to inverted egg-shaped, up to 4 1/2 cm (1 3/4 in) long and 1 1/4 cm (1/2 in) wide, with an indistinctly pointed tip, and the surface hairless or quickly becoming so, while the leaf margins are cartilaginous and set with tough bristles. The leaves one the peduncles are line-shaped, up to about 1 1/4 mm (1/2 in) long and 1 1/2 mm (0.06 in) wide.

The flower heads sit individually at the end of unbranching stalk, that carry narrow leaves almost to the top, are hairy and are occasionally also glandular. The involucre consists of three whorls of bracts. These bracts are bristly and glandular, becoming less hairy further in. The outer bracts are about 5 mm (0.20 in) long and 1 mm (0.039 in) wide, lance-shaped, the middle bracts about 6 mm (0.24 in) long and 2 mm (0.079 in) wide, and the inner bracts inverted lance-shaped about 6 mm long and 1 1/2 mm wide. Each flower head contains about sixteen ray florets, with s pale blue straps of about 10 mm (0.39 in) long and 1 1/2 mm (0.06 in) wide. These encircle numerous disc florets with a yellow corolla of up to 3 1/2 mm (0.14 in) long. In the center of each corolla are five anthers merged into a tube, through which the style grows when the floret opens, hoovering up the pollen on its shaft. At the tip of both style branches are slightly elongated triangular appendages. Around the base of the corolla are numerous, white, clearly toothed and persistent pappus bristles of about 4 1/2 mm (0.18 in) long. At the base of the florets sit elliptic, short-haired, dry, one-seeded, indehiscent fruits called cypselae of about 2 mm (0.079 in) long and 1 mm (0.039 in) wide, with a smooth seed-skin, possibly all of which are sterile.

Felicia wrightii is a diploid having nine sets of homologue chromosomes (2n=18).

== Taxonomy ==
South African botanist Olive Mary Hilliard and English botanist Brian Burtt described Felicia wrightii in 1971, based on a specimen collected in 1967, by Wright on the banks of a tributary of the Mooi River, KwaZulu-Natal province of South Africa.

== Distribution, habitat and conservation ==
Felicia wrightii grows in the Kamberg Nature Reserve, that is situated in the Estcourt district of the Drakensberg Mountains in KwaZulu-Natal. It is only known from one site, where it occurs in montane grassland, growing in damp soil on the bank of a stream, at an altitude of approximately 2,100 m (6,900 ft). However, its population is stable and appears not to be threatened. This is why it is considered critically rare.
