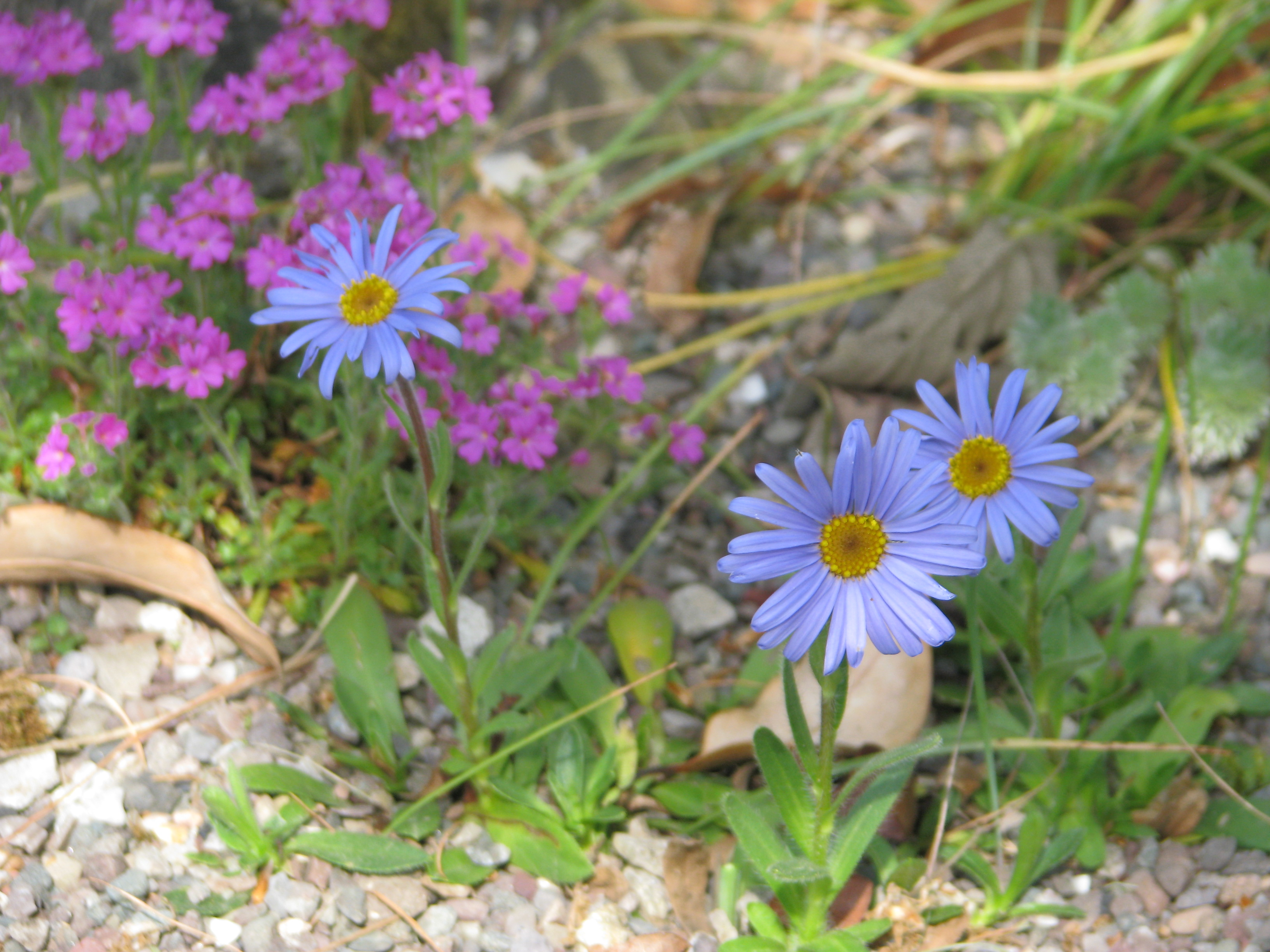
- Felicia rosulata

Scientific classification
- Kingdom: Plantae
- Clade: Tracheophytes
- Clade: Angiosperms
- Clade: Eudicots
- Clade: Asterids
- Order: Asterales
- Family: Asteraceae
- Genus: Felicia
- Section: Felicia sect. Dracontium
- Species: F. rosulata

Binomial name
- Felicia rosulata Yeo

Synonyms
- Agathaea natalensis Sch.Bip. ex Walp.; Aster natalensis Harv.; Felicia natalensis Schltr.

= Felicia rosulata =

Perennial plant in the daisy family from Southern Africa

Felicia rosulata is a hairy, perennial, herbaceous plant of up to 30 cm (1 ft) high, that is assigned to the family Asteraceae. It has a rosette of elliptic 8 cm × 2 cm (3.1 in × 0.8 in) leaves with 3–5 veins, and long, hairy stalks, each topped with one floral head consisting of about thirty middle blue ray florets encircling many yellow disc florets. It can be found in the mountains of Lesotho, eastern South Africa and Eswatini.

== Description ==
Felicia rosulata is a perennial, herbaceous plant of up to 30 cm (1 ft) high. Underneath its leaf rosettes with single-headed upright stems, it has short branched rhizomes, and rarely short runners are present too. Most leaves are in a rosette near the base, alternately arranged on the stem, the lower inverted egg-shaped to elliptic, about 8 cm (3 1/5 in) long and 2 1/2 cm (1 in) wide (rarely 9 × 3 cm), entire or with teeth along its margins. The leaves at the base each have three or five conspicuous main veins, and their surface is short and densely hairy. The leaves along the stem above the rosette are much smaller, lance-shaped, the lowest up to 3 cm (1 1/5 in) long and 4 mm (1/6 in) wide, becoming smaller towards the top.

The flower heads sit individually on top of a densely hairy stalk, near to the head also with scattered glandular hairs. The involucre is about 1 cm (2/5 in) across, and consists of three rows of about equally long bracts, without resin ducts, covered with long bristly and slightly glandular hairs, less hairy further inwards. Those in the outer and inner rows are about 7 mm (1/4 in) long and 1 mm (0.04 in) wide, those in the middle 9 mm (1/3 in) long and 2 mm (0.08 in) wide. About thirty female ray florets with a blue strap and a hairy tube. These encircle many bisexual, disc florets with a yellow corolla of 4–5 mm (0.16–0.20 in) long. In the center of each corolla are five anthers merged into a tube, through which the style grows when the floret opens, hoovering up the pollen on its shaft. At the tip of both style branches is a narrowly triangular appendage. Around the base of the corolla are many white, shortly toothed, deciduous pappus bristles. The brown, dry, one-seeded, indehiscent fruits called cypselae are 3 mm (0.12 in) long and 1 1/2 mm (0.6 in) wide, have a light brown marginal ridge, and the more or less smooth surface carries short hairs.

Felicia rosulata is a diploid having nine sets of homologue chromosomes (2n=18).

== Taxonomy ==
As far as is known, the species was first collected for science by Ferdinand Krauss on the Tafelberg in Natal in 1839. It was described by Carl Heinrich "Bipontinus" Schultz, who named it Agathaea natalensis in 1843. In 1865, William Henry Harvey, who was a lumper sunk Agataea in Aster, creating the combination Aster natalensis. In 1897, Rudolf Schlechter reassigned it again, now to Felicia, making the combination Felicia natalensis. However, the combination Felicia natalensis had already been created by Bipontinus, also in 1843, a name that is now synonymous with Felicia erigerioides, an older name created by Augustin Pyramus de Candolle in 1836. Therefore, since Felicia natalensis is not available, Peter Frederick Yeo created the new combination Felicia rosulata in 1970. In his 1973 revision of the genus Felicia, Jürke Grau regarded all of these names synonymous.

== Distribution ==
Felicia rosulata can be found in Lesotho, Eswatini, and South Africa (Eastern Cape, Free State, KwaZulu-Natal, Limpopo, and Mpumalanga).

== Conservation ==
The continued survival of Felicia rosulata is considered to be of least concern.

== Use ==
Felicia rosulata is used as an ornamental in rock gardens.
