= Felicia cana =

Scientific classification
- Kingdom: Plantae
- Clade: Tracheophytes
- Clade: Angiosperms
- Clade: Eudicots
- Clade: Asterids
- Order: Asterales
- Family: Asteraceae
- Genus: Felicia
- Section: Felicia sect. Felicia
- Species: F. cana

Binomial name
- Felicia cana DC.

Synonyms
- Aster hyssopifolius var. canus

Shrublet in the daisy family from South Africa

Felicia cana is a low and slender shrublet of up to 15 cm (1/2 ft) high, covered in white felty hairs, that is assigned to the family Asteraceae. It has alternately arranged leaves, and flower heads of about 16 mm (0.63 in) across, with 3–4 whorls of involucral bracts, and about 20 blue purple ray florets, surrounding many yellow disc florets in the centre. Very characteristic for the species are also the middle-long hairs with forked tips on the surface of its fruits. It is an endemic species that is restricted to a zone along the southern coast of the Western Cape province of South Africa.

== Description ==
Felicia cana is an upright, richly branched shrub of up to 15 cm (6 in) high. All parts except for the florets are covered in dense white felty hairs. The leaves are arranged alternately, are succulent, inverted lance-shaped in outline, up to 1 1/2 cm (0.6 in) long and 1 1/2 mm (0.06 in) wide, set at an oblique upward angle.

The flower heads sit individually at the tip of an inflorescence stalk of up to 4 cm (1 3/5 in) long. Just beneath the flower heads the indumentum is less dense. The involucre that envelops the florets is up to 4 mm (0.16 in) in diameter, and consists of three to four whorls of bracts that are lance-shaped. The bracts in the outer whorl are about 2.5 mm (0.098 in) long and 1 mm (0.039 in) wide, and covered in white felty hairs. The bracts in the inner whorl are about 3.2 mm (0.13 in) long and 1 mm (0.039 in) wide and these tend to loose the indumentum, and have a resinous vein along the middle.

About twenty female ray florets have blue violet straps of about 6 mm (0.24 in) long and 1 mm (0.04 in) wide. In the center of the head are many yellow, bisexual disc florets of about 2 1/2 mm (0.1 in) long. In the center of the corolla of each disc floret are five anthers merged into a tube, through which the style grows when the floret opens, hoovering up the pollen on its shaft. The style in both ray- and disc florets forks, and at the tip of both style branches is a broadly triangular appendage.

Surrounding the base of the corolla are many white, deciduous pappus bristles of about 2 1/2 mm (0.1 in) long, that are strongly serrated near the base and weakly near the top. The eventually yellowish brown, dry, one-seeded, indehiscent fruits called cypselae are inverted egg-shaped, about 2 mm (0.079 in) long and 1 mm (0.039 in) wide, with a prominent, ridge along the margin, and scales on its surface. The middle long hairs that also occur scattered along its surface have a forked tip, but the hairs along the edge are not widened near their tips.

=== Differences with related species ===
F. cana is closely related to F. hyssopifolia, but differs from it by its dense covering of white felty hairs, the hairs on the surface of the cypselae that fork at their tips and the slender habit.

== Taxonomy ==
Augustin Pyramus de Candolle was the first to recognise the distinctiveness of this species from Felicia hyssopifolia, and he described it in 1836 as Felicia cana, based on a collection made by Ecklon in 1805 near Swellendam. William Henry Harvey regarded it as a variety of Aster hyssopifolia (now Felicia hyssopifolia), making the combination Aster hyssopifolia var. canus. Jürke Grau agreed with De Candolle in his 1973 Revision of the genus Felicia, and restored the taxon to a species within the genus Felicia.

== Distribution and conservation ==
Felicia cana occurs in the Western Cape province of South Africa between Riversdale and Bredasdorp.

The continued survival of this species is considered to be of least concern, because it has a stable population.
