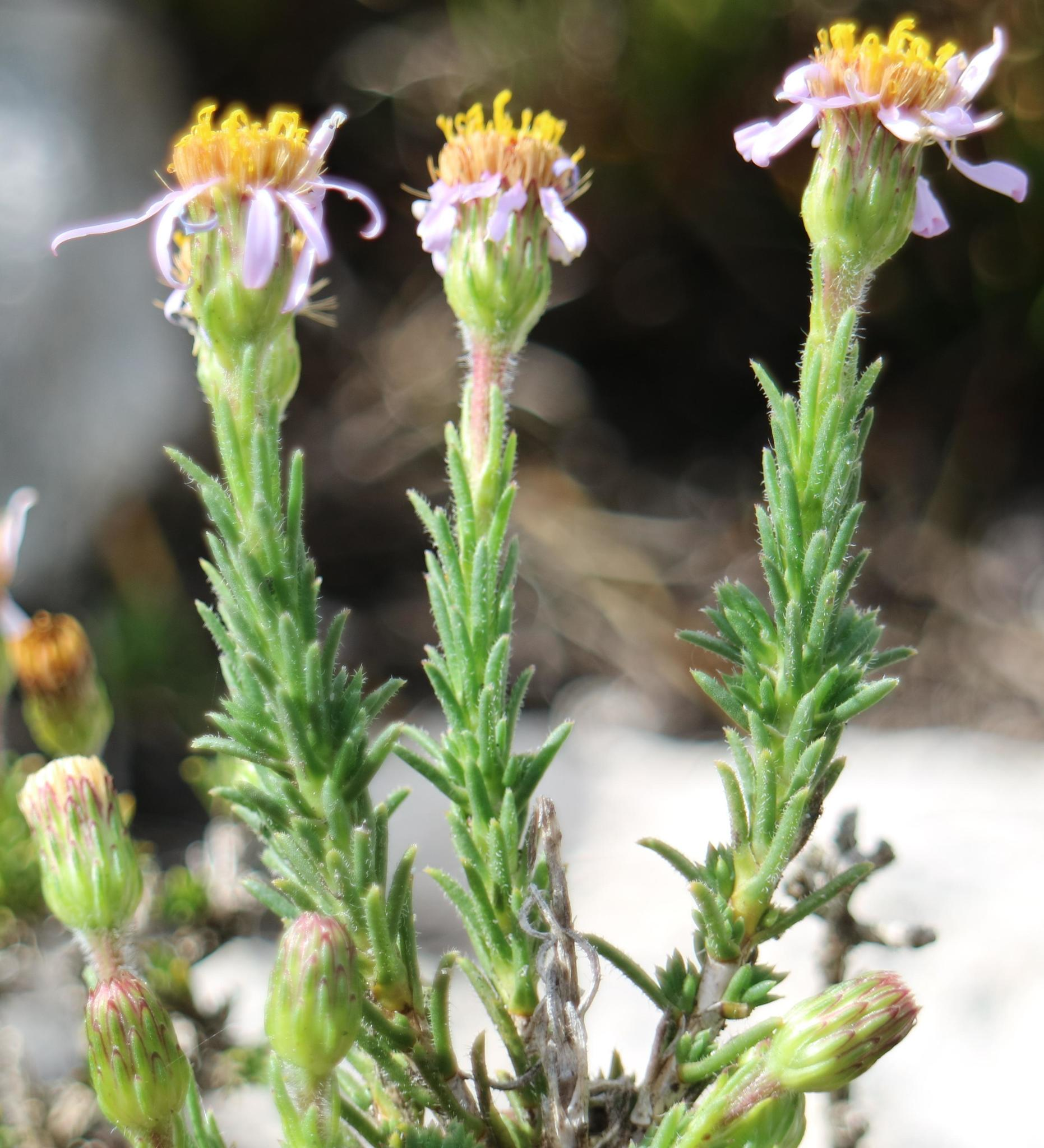

Scientific classification
- Kingdom: Plantae
- Clade: Tracheophytes
- Clade: Angiosperms
- Clade: Eudicots
- Clade: Asterids
- Order: Asterales
- Family: Asteraceae
- Genus: Felicia
- Section: Felicia sect. Lignofelicia
- Species: F. canaliculata

Binomial name
- Felicia canaliculata Grau

= Felicia canaliculata =

Shrublet in the daisy family from South Africa

Felicia canaliculata is a grayish green shrublet in the family Asteraceae that grows up to 40 cm (16 in) in height. It has narrow, awl-shaped leaves, relatively large flower heads with approximately a dozen light purple to white ray florets encircling many yellow disc florets. It can only be found in the Western Cape province of South Africa.

== Description ==
Felicia canaliculata is a low, densely branched, upright, up to 40 cm (16 in) high shrub. It has gray felty stems, ending in long shoots and having indistinct, short side shoots. The leaves are alternately set, densely overlapping and pointing upwards. The lower parts have shed their leaves and sometimes the scaly leaf bases remain. The leaves are up to 10 mm (0.4 in) long and 1 mm (0.04 in) wide, awl-shaped with a broad base, the margins curled upwards creating a groove, gray-green in colour, with a wrinkled surface, on the underside of particularly the upper leaves and along the margin are bristly hairs, while the leaf axils are woolly hairy.

The flower heads are large and are set individually at the end of the long shoots on stalks of about 4 cm long that carry two to three small bracts, covered in perpendicular bristly hairs. The involucre is about 1½ cm (0.6 in) in diameter and consists of bracts arranged in about four rows. These bracts are large, overlapping, narrowly oblong, obtuse, gland-covered, red at the top, slightly serrated, the outer 3 mm (0.12 in) long and 1 mm (0.04 in) wide with few bristles, the inner 7 mm (0.28 in) long and 1½ mm (0.06 in) wide with a narrow papery edge. The approximately ten to thirteen, light violet to white, female ray florets are hairless and encircle many yellow bisexual disc florets, in the lower part loosely set with delicate multi-cellular glandular hairs. In the center of the florets, a style with narrow triangular extensions grows through the five anthers that have merged into a tube. The yellowish pappus bristles are persistent, and come in two different lengths. The longer numerous, powerful, toothed, widened at the top, to 6 mm (0.24 in) long. The shorter pappus bristles are up to 0.7 mm (0.03 in) long, wide scales. The cypselae are large, up to 4 mm (0.16 in) long and 2 mm (0.08 in) wide, elliptic, smooth to slightly scaly, with marginal ridges, with long silky brown hairy along the edge and at the base.

=== Differences from related species ===
Felicia canaliculata looks similar to the widespread species F. filifolia, from which it mainly differs in being covered in felty hairs, and the large flower heads with lush bracts.

== Taxonomy ==
This species was first distinguished by Jürke Grau, who described it in 1973. The species is considered part of the section Lignofelicia.

== Distribution and habitat ==
Felicia canaliculata is an endemic species that is restricted to an area south of Bredasdorp in South Africa.

== Conservation ==
Felicia canaliculata is considered to be of least concern due to its stable population.
