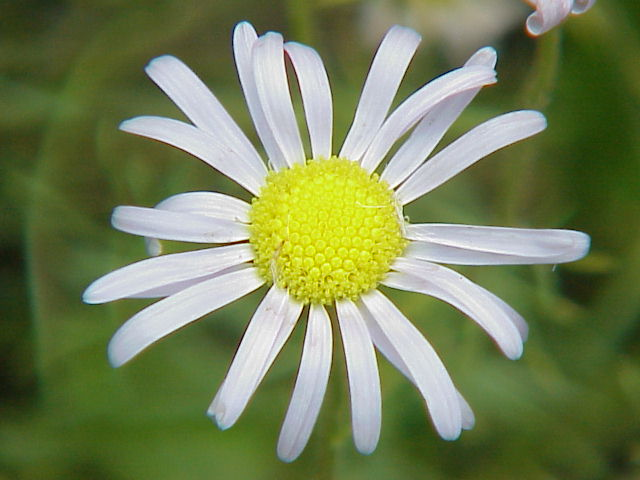

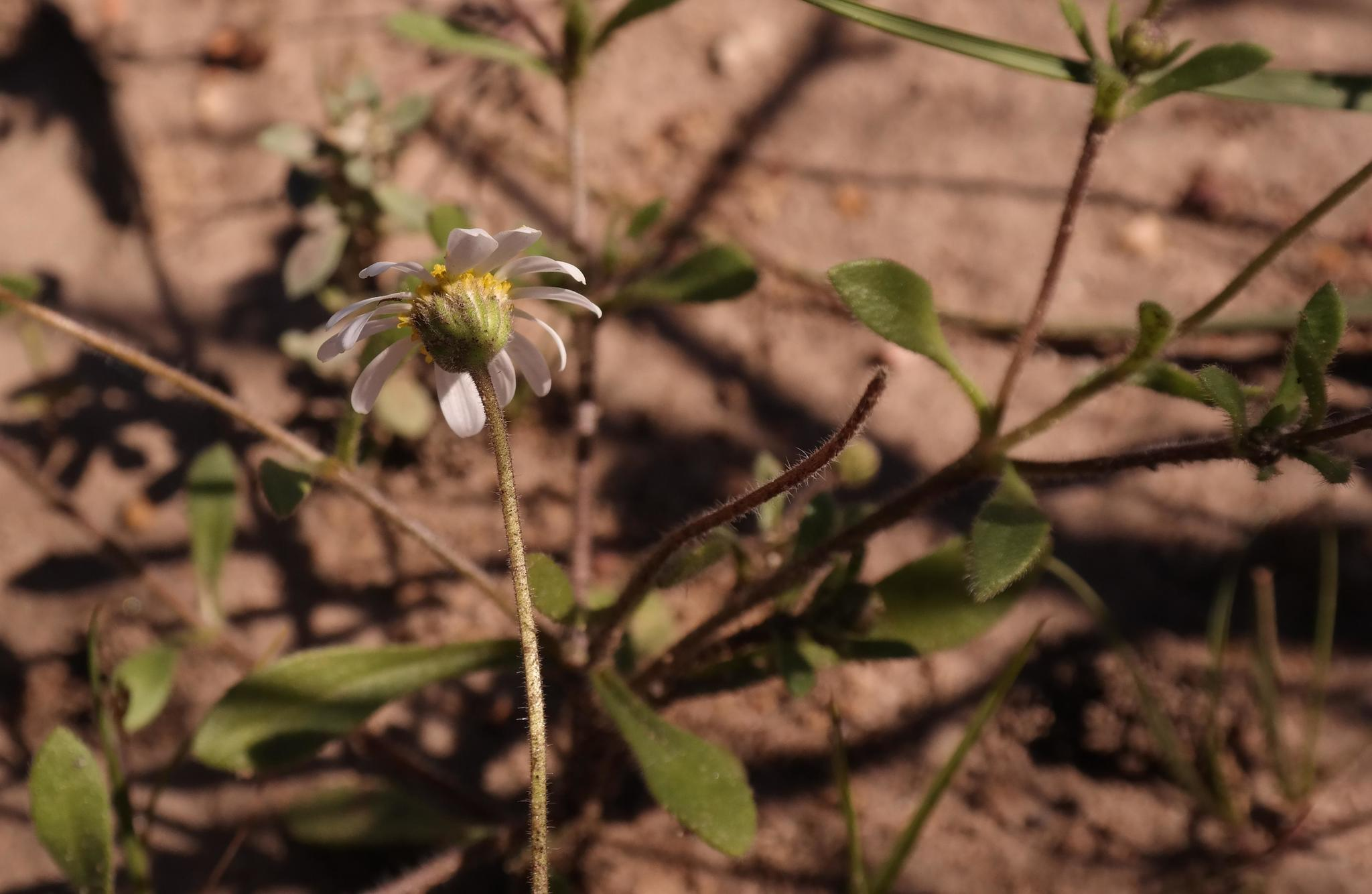

Scientific classification
- Kingdom: Plantae
- Clade: Tracheophytes
- Clade: Angiosperms
- Clade: Eudicots
- Clade: Asterids
- Order: Asterales
- Family: Asteraceae
- Genus: Felicia
- Section: Felicia sect. Neodetris
- Species: F. bergeriana

Binomial name
- Felicia bergeriana (Spreng.) O.Hoffm.

Synonyms
- Elphegea bergeriana, Detridium bergerianum, Agathaea bergeriana, Aster bergerianus, Cineraria bergeriana; Kaulfussia amelloides

= Felicia bergeriana =

Annual plant in the daisy family from South Africa

Felicia bergeriana is a richly branching, hairy annual plant of up to 25 cm (10 in) high that is assigned to the family Asteraceae. It has opposite leaves and flower heads set individually on up to 8 cm (3 1/5 in) long stalks, that consist of an involucre of about 1/2 cm (1/5 in) diameter with two whorls of bracts, about twelve blue ray florets surrounding more yellow disc florets. It is sometimes called kingfisher daisy in English. It can be found in the Northern and Western Cape provinces of South Africa. It is sometimes cultivated as an ornamental.

== Description ==
Felicia bergeriana is an annual, moderately sturdy, upright herbaceous plant of up to 25 cm (10 in) high that branches regularly towards the top. Its stems are covered in perpendicular bristles and glands. The leaves are all oppositely arranged on the stems, lance-, ellipse-, spoon- or inverted lance-shaped, up to 3 1/2 cm (1.4 in) long and 0.6–1 cm (0.24–0.39 in) wide, entire or with some short teeth, without or with an indistinct stalk and covered in long hairs.

The flower heads sit individually on top of up to 8 cm (3 1/5 in) long stalks, that may carry few small alternately set bracts. The involucre is up to 1/2 cm (1/5 in) in diameter and consists of 2 whorls of bracts. These bracts are all equal in length at about 3 1/2 mm (0.14 in) long, the outer lance-shaped, about 1 mm (0.039 in) wide, the inner inverted egg-shaped, about 1 1/2 mm wide, with a papery edge, all covered in bristles and glandular hairs. Each flower heads contains about twelve ray florets with a blue strap of about 7 mm (0.28 in) long and 1 1/2 mm (0.06 in) wide. These encircle more numerous, yellow disc florets of up to 2 1/2 mm (0.1 in) long, those next to the ray florets bisexual and those in the center male. Surrounding the base of the corolla are about ten, quickly discarded, white, protruding bristly pappus bristles of about 1 1/2–2 1/2 mm (0.06–0.10 in) long. The relatively large, eventually yellowish to reddish brown, dry, one-seeded, indehiscent fruits called cypselae are about 3 mm (0.12 in) long and wide, inverted egg-shaped, the surface and the edge of the otherwise hairless marginal ridges are covered with strong, up to 1 mm (0.04 in) long hairs, while the seedskin is covered in scales. The cypselae of the innermost disc florets are hairless.

== Taxonomy ==
The kingfisher daisy was first described by Kurt Polycarp Joachim Sprengel in 1826, based on a specimen that had been collected by Christian Friedrich Ecklon on the Montis Dorsi Leonis (probably Signal Hill, near Cape Town), and he called it Cineraria bergeriana. In 1832, Christian Friedrich Lessing reassigned the species to the genus Elphegea, making the combination Elphegea bergeriana. One year later, followed by Nees von Esenbeck, who called it Detridium bergerianum. In 1836, Augustin Pyramus de Candolle again reassigned it, making the combination Agathaea bergeriana. William Henry Harvey, who merged several genera into Aster, created the name A. bergerianum in 1865. Harry Bolus and Anthony Hurt Wolley-Dod in 1950 assign the species to the genus Felicia, creating the combination Felicia bergeriana. Jürke Grau in his 1973 Revision of the genus Felicia (Asteraceae), considered all these names synonymous, but making a spelling error, quoting F. bergerana.

== Distribution and conservation ==
The kingfisher daisy can be found thinly scattered between Namaqualand in the north to the Cape Peninsula in the south. The continued survival of Felicia bergeriana is considered to be of least concern because its population is stable.
