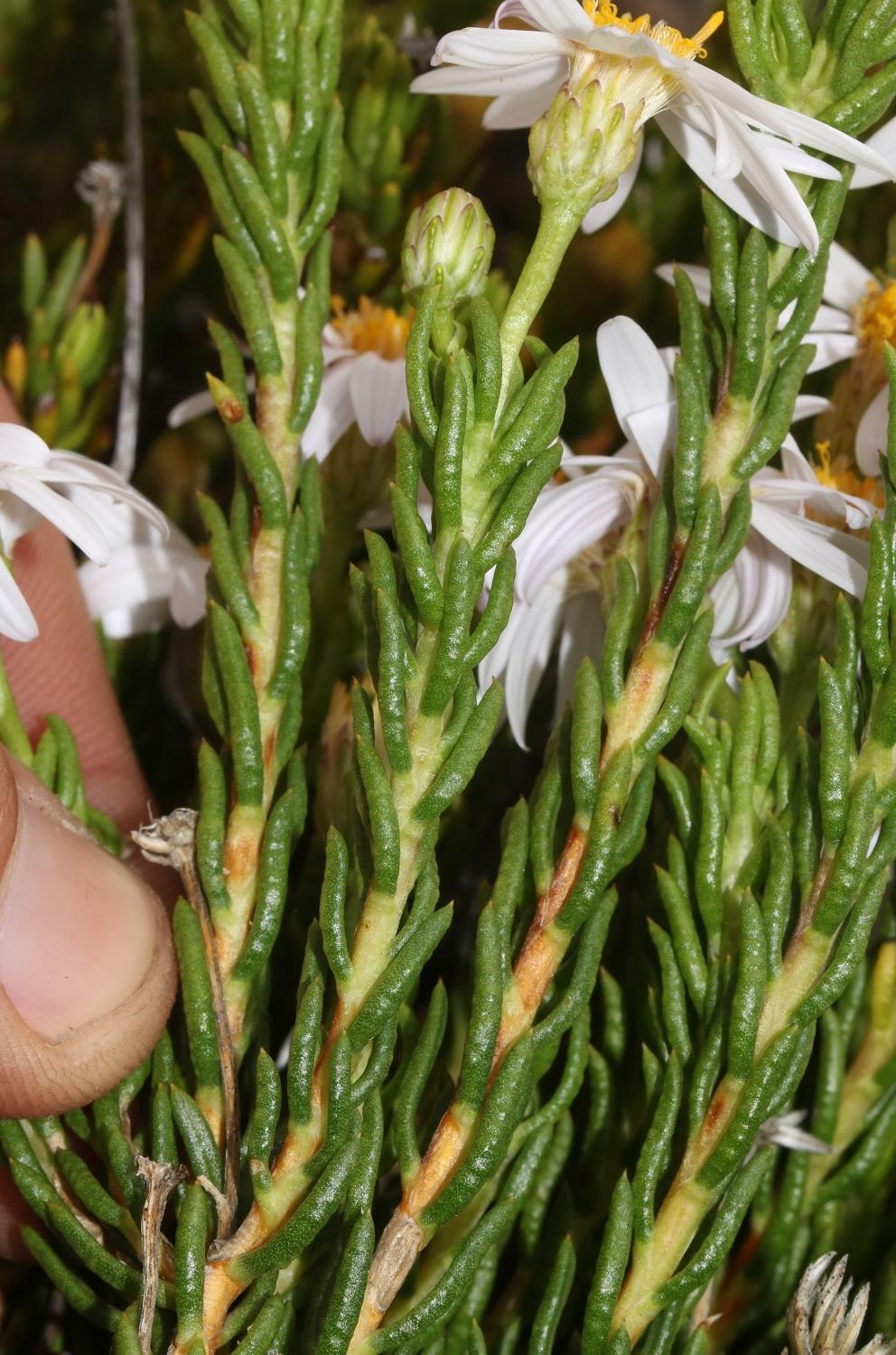

Scientific classification
- Kingdom: Plantae
- Clade: Tracheophytes
- Clade: Angiosperms
- Clade: Eudicots
- Clade: Asterids
- Order: Asterales
- Family: Asteraceae
- Genus: Felicia
- Section: Felicia sect. Lignofelicia
- Species: F. oleosa

Binomial name
- Felicia oleosa Grau

= Felicia oleosa =

Shrublet in the daisy family from South Africa

Felicia oleosa is an evergreen, richly branched dwarf shrub of up to 30 cm (12 in) high, that is assigned to the family Asteraceae. It has narrow, awl-shaped leaves, with translucent oil or resin dots, pointing upwards, crowded on the younger stems. The flower heads have about thirteen bright blue ray florets, encircling many yellow disc florets. This species grows in the mountains dividing the Karoo region of South Africa. It is sometimes called oily blue daisy in English.

== Description ==
Felicia oleosa is an evergreen, upright, up to 30 cm (12 in) tall, relatively richly branched shrub. The older shoots have lost their leaves. The leaves are set alternately on the stem, overlapping, pointed upward, awl-shaped, up to 7 mm (0.28 in) long and 1 mm (0.039 in) wide, with a broad base, arched below, flat top, bare except for the edge of the leaf base which is fringed with hairs, inside with numerous translucent resin or oil ducts. The leaf axils are barely noticeably hairy.

The flower heads sit individually on top of a short stalk, rarely up to 4 cm (1 1/2 in) long, with numerous small bracts, and softly hairy toward the upper end. The involucre is about 6 mm in diameter and consists of three to four rows of straw yellow, overlapping bracts with red-tinged tips. These bracts are narrowly lance-shaped, about 1 mm (0.039 in) wide, hairless except for a fringe along the narrow papery margin and contain resin or oil ducts. The outer ones are about 3 mm (0.12 in) long and the inner 7 mm (1/4 in) long. The approximately thirteen female bright blue ray florets have straps of about 9 mm (3/8 in) long and 2 mm (0.079 in) wide. The numerous bisexual yellow disc florets have a corolla of 5 mm (1/5 in) long. In the center of each corolla are five anthers merged into a tube, through which the style grows when the floret opens, hoovering up the pollen on its shaft. At the tip of both style branches is a triangular appendage. Around the base of the corolla are numerous, brownish white, short-toothed, persistent pappus bristles, which are all of the same length, up to about 5 mm (1/5 in). The dry, one-seeded, indehiscent fruits called cypselae are elliptic, about 3 mm (0.12 in) long and 1 1/2 mm wide, evenly silky long haired or with the hairs limited to the base and the edge.

=== Differences with other Felicia species ===
In contrast to F. venusta, the leaves of F. oleosa overlap, point upwards, and contain translucent resin or oil ducts. The involucral bracts are narrowly lance-shaped and also contain ducts. The pappus consists of bristles with short teeth.

== Taxonomy ==
As far as known, this species was first collected for science by Robert Harold Compton in 1926, but has not been distinguished for a long time from F. venusta. It was first described by Jürke Grau in 1973. F. oleosa is considered part of the section Lignofelicia.

== Distribution, habitat and ecology ==
Felicia oleosa is only known from locations between Laingsburg in the west and Prince Albert in the east along the southern edge of the Great Karoo, where it grows amongst rocks, on the upper sandstone slopes of the Witteberg, the Klein and Groot Swartberg Mountains, at an altitude of around 1,500 m (4,900 ft), in a habitat called fynbos. This species has been found growing in the company of the restionid Rhodocoma arida, Pelargonium ovale, Erica nervata, E. fimbrata, E. discolor, Leucadendron dregei, Protea eximia, P. montana, Cyclopia bolusii, Lobelia tomentosa, Helichrysum tinctum, Seriphium plumosum and Stoebe plumosum.

== Conservation ==
Felicia oleosa is considered to be a rare species because, although its population is stable and its habitat is inaccessible enough to not be threatened, it is only known from three locations.
