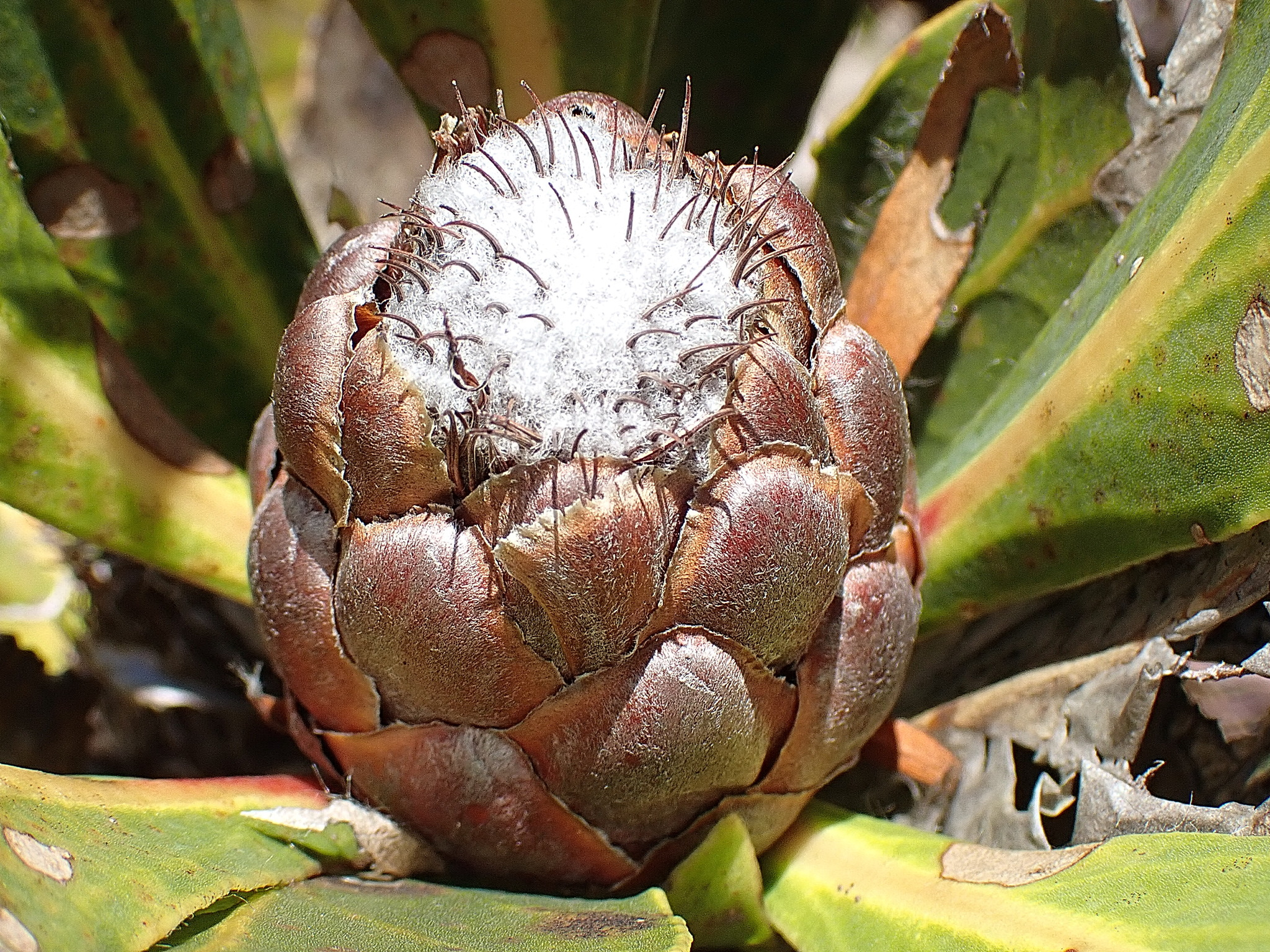

Conservation status
- Least Concern (IUCN 3.1)

Scientific classification
- Kingdom: Plantae
- Clade: Embryophytes
- Clade: Tracheophytes
- Clade: Angiosperms
- Clade: Eudicots
- Order: Proteales
- Family: Proteaceae
- Genus: Protea
- Species: P. vogtsiae

Binomial name
- Protea vogtsiae Rourke

= Protea vogtsiae =

Species of flowering plant

Protea vogtsiae, also known as the Kouga sugarbush, is a small flowering shrub of the genus Protea within the family Proteaceae, which is only found growing in the wild in the southern Cape Region of South Africa.

It was named after Marie Vogts. In the Afrikaans language it has been given the vernacular name of Marie-se-roossuikerbos.

== Taxonomy ==
Protea vogtsiae was first collected flowering in August 1972 at 1,067 metres (3,501 ft) elevation on the lower southern slopes of the Saptoukop mountain in the Kouga range near the town of Willowmore by the South African botanist John Patrick Rourke. Rourke subsequently described it as a species new to science in an article in the Journal of South African Botany published in 1974. An isotype of Rourke's original collection (#1396) is housed in the herbarium at the Kew Botanical Gardens.

=== Classification ===
P. vogtsiae was classified in section Crinitae by Tony Rebelo in 1995, what he calls the "eastern ground sugarbushes", along with P. foliosa, P. intonsa and P. montana.

== Description ==
This species grows in the form of a low, dwarf shrublet only 25 centimetres (9.8 in) in height. It has subterranean stems (rhizomes), these have a characteristically scaled bark. The stems form loose tufts of leaves 20–50 centimetres (7.9–19.7 in) across. It has glaucous blue leaves forming a rosette, which blooms at ground level. The leaves are 12–25 centimetres (4.7–9.8 in) in length and 8–30 mm in width. The inflorescences are specialised structures called pseudanthia, also known simply as flower heads, containing hundred of reduced flowers, called florets. The involucral bracts are coloured dull carmine, flushed with green. It is monoecious, with both sexes occurring in each floret.

=== Similar species ===
Protea vogtsiae is similar to P. intonsa in section Crinitae, both being dwarf shrubs with subterranean stems, but has broader leaves more similar to those of P. foliosa, which is a much larger shrub with numerous erect-growing branches and with much broader, rounder and shorter leaves.

== Distribution ==
It is endemic to South Africa, where it is found in the mountain ranges straddling the southern border of Western and Eastern Cape provinces: the Outeniqua and Kouga mountains as well as the Baviaanskloof. It occurs on the Saptoukop and Hoopsberg in the Kouga Mountains. Different populations are small and isolated from each other, but nonetheless where it locally occurs it is common.

== Ecology ==
The plant grows exclusively in a fynbos habitat in the wild, where it is found on steep, rocky, south-facing slopes. It grows in substrates derived from sandstone. It is found at altitudes of 1,000 to 1,500 metres (3,300 to 4,900 ft). It grows wedged between Table Mountain Sandstone boulders.

The mature plants are killed by the wildfires which periodically pass through its habitat, but the seeds can survive such an event.

It blooms in spring, from August to November. The flowers are pollinated by rodents. In 1977 the botanists Delbert Wiens and John Patrick Rourke first proposed this pollination method in certain Protea species. After they mature, the seeds stored in the old, dry infructescences, are persistently retained on the branches of the plant. When, after two years or so, the seeds are finally released, they are dispersed by means of the wind.

== Conservation ==
The conservation status of Protea vogtsiae was first assessed in 1980 as 'indeterminate'. In 1991 the distribution was believed to be restricted to a relatively small area, and Jan Vlok from Cape Nature Conservation stated that most of its habitat had been destroyed by agriculture. He refrained from assigning it a conservation status, however, as he suspected there might be more extant populations than the several he knew of. In 1996 the South African National Botanical Institute, later the South African National Biodiversity Institute (SANBI), assessed the conservation status of the species as 'not threatened' for the Red list of southern African plants, nonetheless it was considered rare in 1998. In 2009 SANBI re-assessed the species as 'least concern', a position they reiterated in the 2019 assessment. The total population numbers are believed to be stable as of 2019.

== See also ==
- List of Protea species
