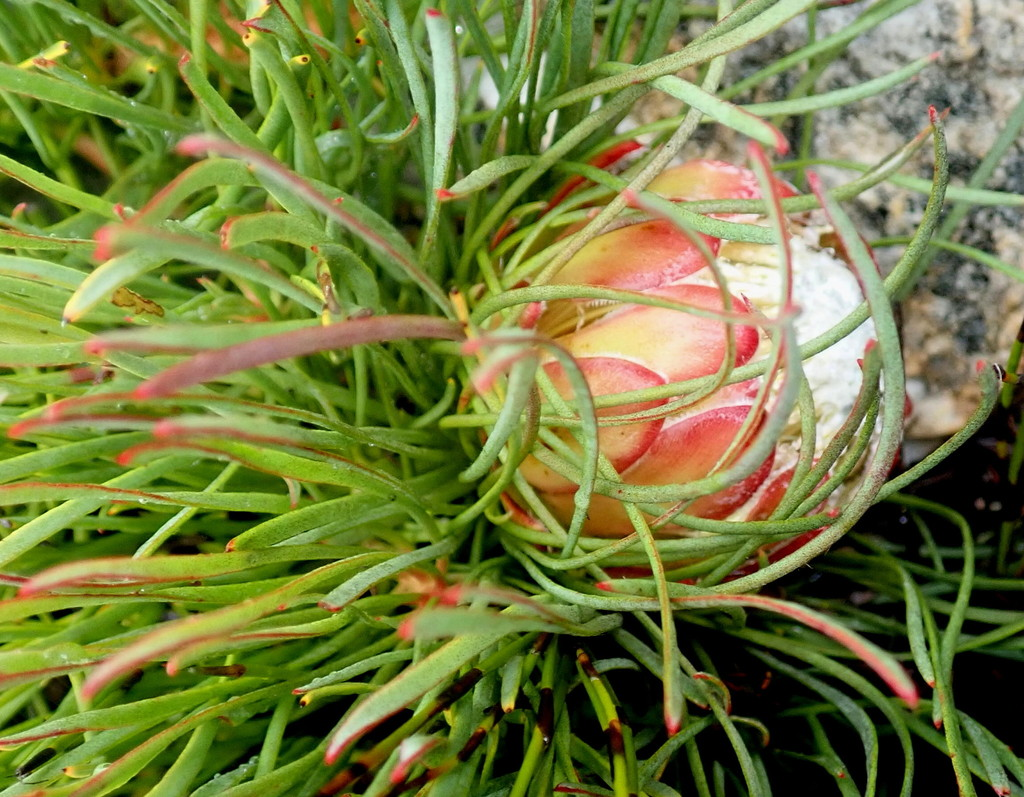
- Protea montana developing inflorescence

Conservation status
- Vulnerable (IUCN 3.1)

Scientific classification
- Kingdom: Plantae
- Clade: Embryophytes
- Clade: Tracheophytes
- Clade: Angiosperms
- Clade: Eudicots
- Order: Proteales
- Family: Proteaceae
- Genus: Protea
- Species: P. montana

Binomial name
- Protea montana E.Mey. ex Meisn.

Synonyms
- Protea tugwelliae E.Phillips; Scolymocephalus montanus (E.Mey. ex Meisn.) Kuntze

= Protea montana =

Species of flowering plant endemic to South Africa

Protea montana also known as the Swartberg sugarbush, is a flowering plant of the genus Protea within the family Proteaceae, which is endemic to the southwestern Cape Region of South Africa. In Afrikaans it is known as swartbergsuikerbos.

== Taxonomy ==
Protea montana was first scientifically collected at 5,000 feet (1,500 m) elevation by the German plant collector and horticulturalist Johann Franz Drège in August 1829, (Note: The date 1840 is written on the herbarium specimen sheet at Kew, but this is doubtlessly not the collection date, as Drège had long returned to Europe by that time. Note Kew has indexed the same sheet three times.) when he was exploring the eastern flanks of the Groot Swartberg Mountains with Karl Zeyher in the area of the farm of Vrolykheid. When he returned to Europe from Africa, he detailed his botanical adventures in his 1843 work Zwei pflanzengeographische Documente, which detailed where he collected what each month in a brief diary-like format. This work is the first in which the name P. montana was published. In an index appended to the back of the book, Drège attributes the name to Ernst Heinrich Friedrich Meyer, but aside from this, nothing else is published about it, thus the name was officially an invalid nomen nudum. This situation was rectified by the Swiss taxonomist Carl Meissner in 1856, when he validated the name with a formal species description in the Prodromus book series of botanical taxonomy begun by Augustin Pyramus de Candolle.

=== Type ===
Drège made a number of different dried and flattened exsiccata specimen sheets from his Vrolykheid collection, and these he traded or sold across Europe. One sheet found its way into the herbarium of George Bentham, and when he decided to get rid of his collection in 1854 he donated it to the Kew Botanical Gardens, where, in the herbarium there, it still remains housed today. It was designated an isotype by the South African botanist Edwin Percy Phillips, but half a century later, in 1960 the South African botanist Hedley Brian Rycroft realised that the sheet was composed of parts from different individual plants: one part was in fact P. amplexicaulis. (Note: Note Kew has indexed the same sheet differently three times.)

=== Classification ===
P. montana was classified in Protea section Crinitae by Tony Rebelo in 1995, what he calls the "eastern ground sugarbushes", along with P. foliosa, P. intonsa and P. vogtsiae.

== Description ==
=== Habitus ===
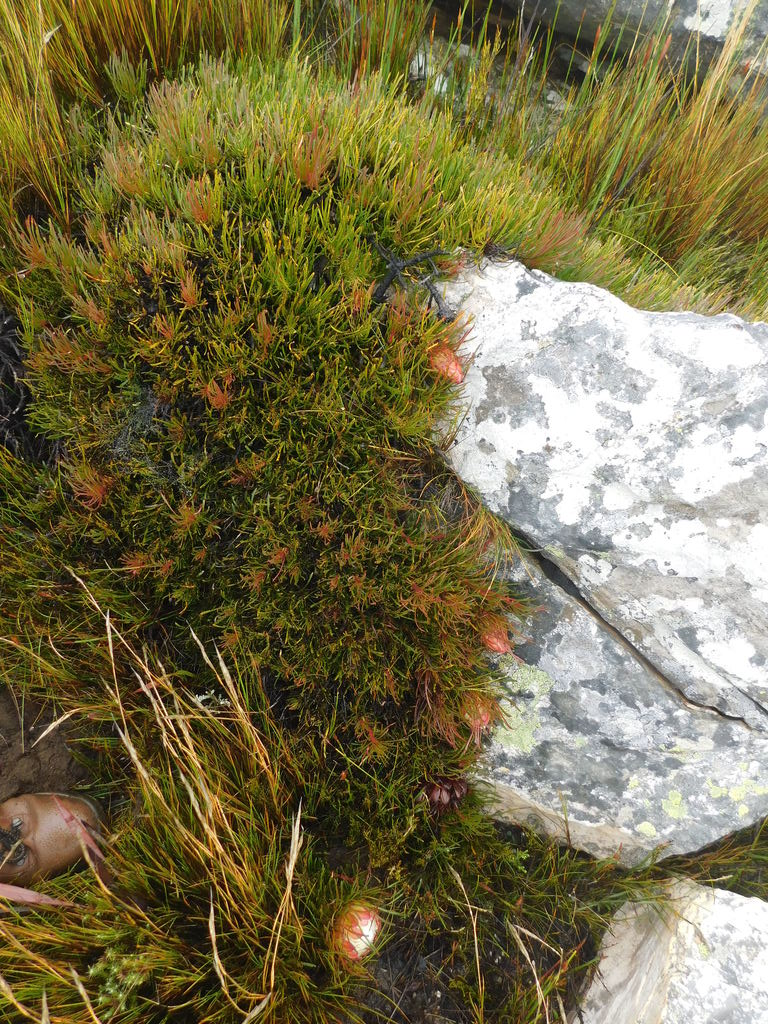
Habitus

This plant is a low, prostrate shrub forming sprawling mats up to 4 metres (13 ft) wide. The main stem is subterranean. The stems branching from that branch themselves numerous times, but only grow above-ground to leaf and flower-bearing parts which are 4 inches (10 cm) long.

=== Leaves ===
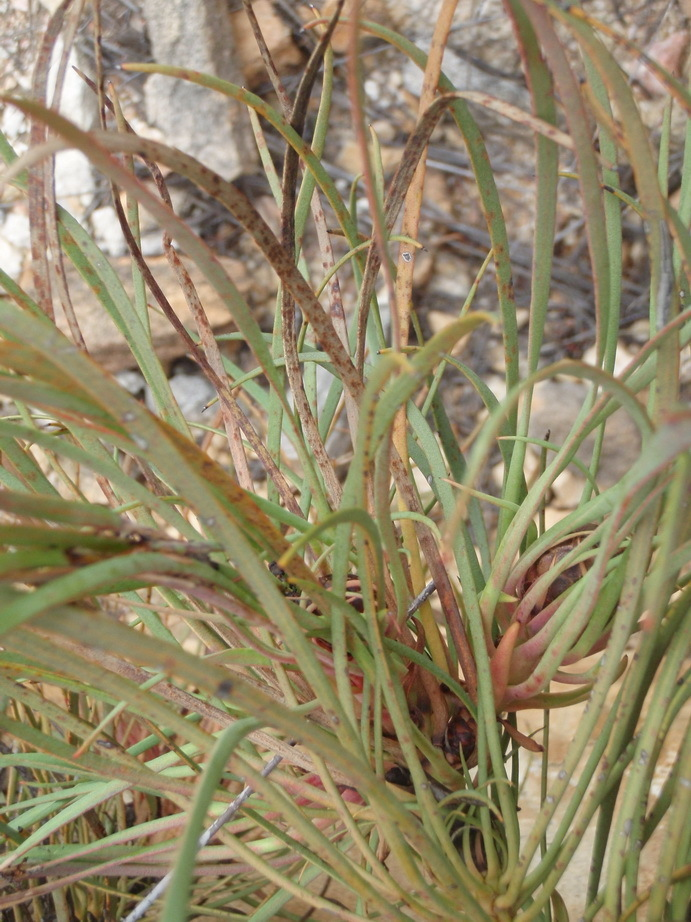
Leaves

It has linear to oblanceolate leaves, indistinctly veined and ending in a sharp mucronate point, which grow up to 1.75–3 inches (4.4–7.6 cm) in length, and 1.6 to 3.7mm in width. The base of the leaves attenuates gradually to the broadest point. The leaves are adpressly hairy, soon becoming glabrous.

=== Flowers ===
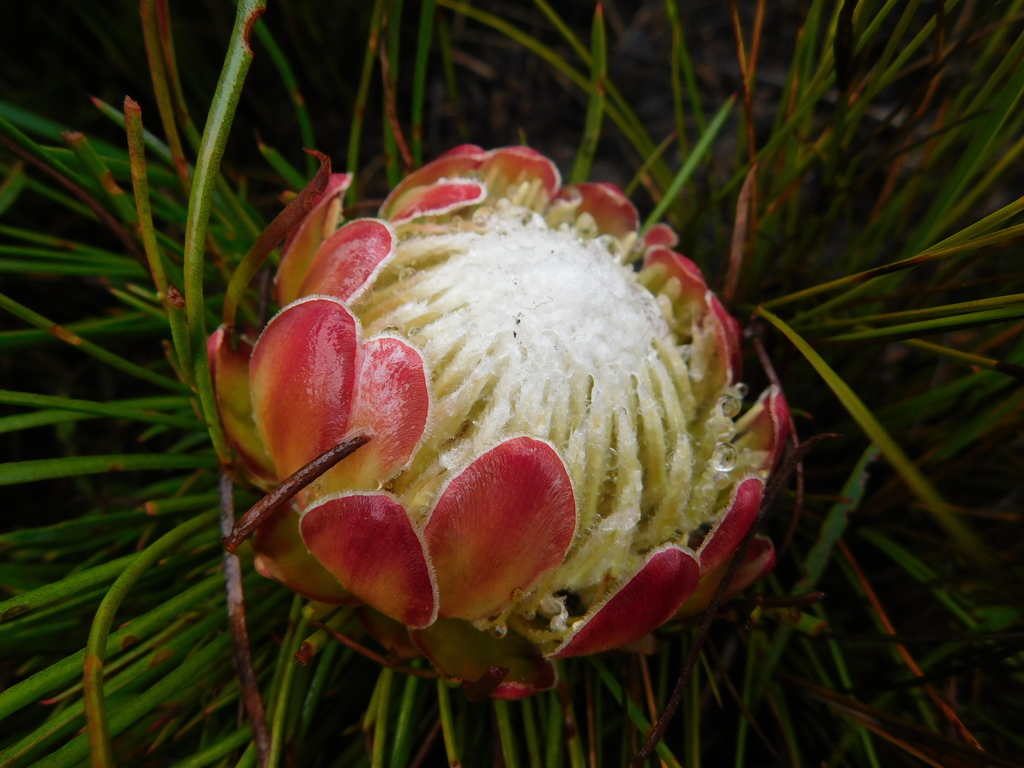
Flower head

The inflorescences are specialised structures called pseudanthia, also known simply as flower heads, containing hundred of reduced flowers, called florets. These flower heads are sessile in this species, lacking a peduncle and growing directly from the stem. The flower heads are 2 inches (5.1 cm) long and 1.5 inches (3.8 cm) in diameter, and are completely covered in leaves. The inflorescences are surrounded by six to seven series of petal-like appendages known as 'involucral bracts'. The outer bracts are ovate and covered in silky-pubescent hairs, and grow until they become long and leaf-like. The inner bracts are oblong to spathulate-oblong, are fringed with ciliate hairs along their margins, have the same type of silky-pubescent indumentum on their outside surfaces and are the same length as the actual flowers.

The plant is monoecious, both sexes occur in each flower. The petals and sepals of the florets are fused into a tube-like, 23.3 mm long perianth-sheath which is membranous, dilated and glabrous at the very base, but otherwise largely covered in reddish pubescence. The sheath is furthermore dilated, having three keels and five veins on the lower part. The sheath has a lip (pollen-presenter) which is 10.6 mm long. The lip has three prongs, and is glabrous on the lower portion except for the ciliate margin, but increasingly covered in pubescence near the apex, and ending in a dense woolly tuft. The two prongs at the sides are 4.2 mm long, linear in shape and woolly, whereas the middle prong is 2.1 mm long, linear and woolly. All of the stamens are fertile. The filament is 1mm long and swollen. The anthers are linear and 5.3 mm long. The apical glands are 0.5 mm long, ovate in shape, and end in a somewhat sharp apex. The ovary is 4.2 mm long, oblong-elliptic, and covered with long, reddish-brown hairs. The style is 23.3 mm long, falcate and glabrous, narrowing from the base upwards and flattened at the upper parts. The finely channeled stigma is 5.3 mm long, ends in a blunt point, and almost imperceptibly joins and becomes the style.

=== Similar species ===
P. montana is the only mat-forming species in the section Crinitae, but the leaves are similar to those of P. intonsa, which also occurs in the same mountain ranges; this is a much smaller, tuft-forming species with almost completely subterranean stems. In his original 1856 species description, working from incomplete herbarium sheets, Meissner states he finds the species to be dubious, and questions if it was not some variety of P. scolymocephala. Drège himself appears to have confused P. montana with P. amplexicaulis, as one flower head of that species is mixed with the P. montana material on the specimen housed at Kew, and in 1897 Phillips also (briefly) misidentified a Kew specimen of P. scabriuscula as P. montana.

== Distribution ==
Protea montana is endemic to the Western Cape province of South Africa. It is found in the Swartberg and Kammanassie Mountains. The extent of occurrence (the total area of the region in which it might be found) is 1,447 km^{2} (559 sq mi), but the amount of area it actually occupies, the area of occupancy, is only 112 km^{2} (43 sq mi). Only occurring near mountain summits, the different population fragments are scattered throughout the range, especially being fragmented in the Kammanassie Mountains. The spatial distribution is as solitary plants found sporadically in the landscape.

== Ecology ==
The mature plants are killed by the periodic wildfires which pass over their range, but the seeds can survive such an event. The blooms are produced from February to June. The florets are pollinated by rodents. The seeds are stored in the old, dry, fire-resistant infructescence, and are released from them after two years, after fires have passed through the land. The seeds are dispersed by means of the wind.

In 1829 Drège originally collected it growing in rocky locations, together with the other plant species Restio laniger, Seriphium plumosum, Leucadendron dregei, and a Sorocephalus, Erica, Hoplophyllum and Calopsis of some kind.

=== Habitat ===
It is found on mountain tops and their steep upper slopes, between 1,600 and 2,000 metres (5,200 and 6,600 ft) in altitude. It occurs in montane fynbos habitat in sandstone-derived substrates, on south-facing slopes.

== Gallery ==
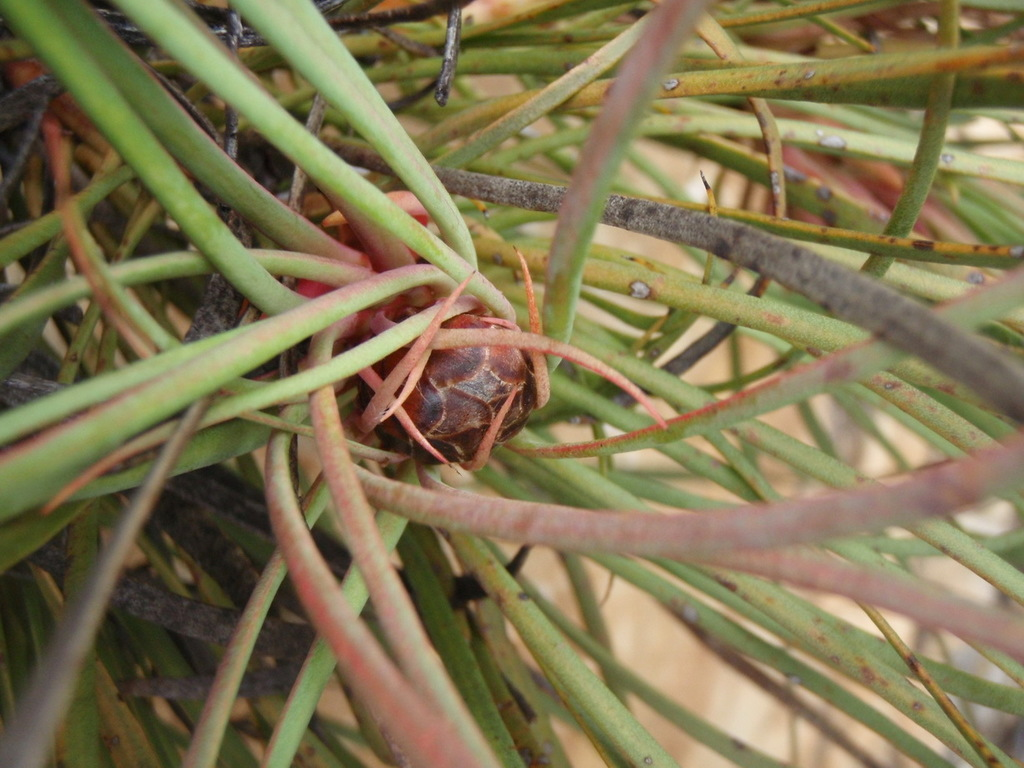
Developing inflorescence

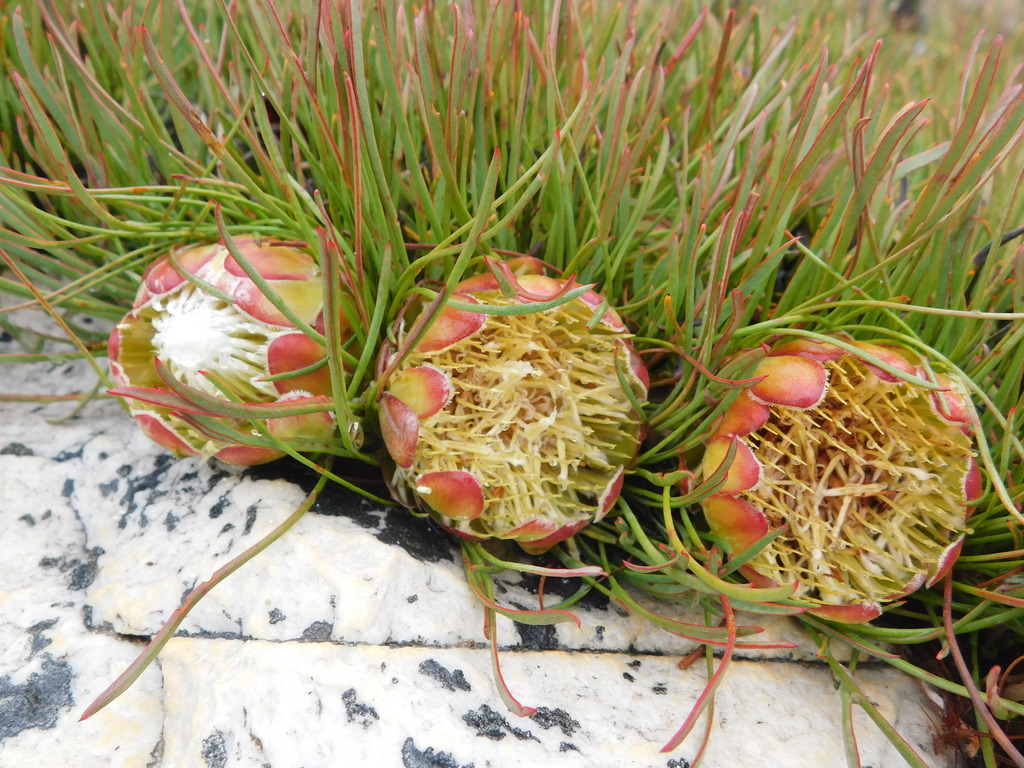
Flower heads

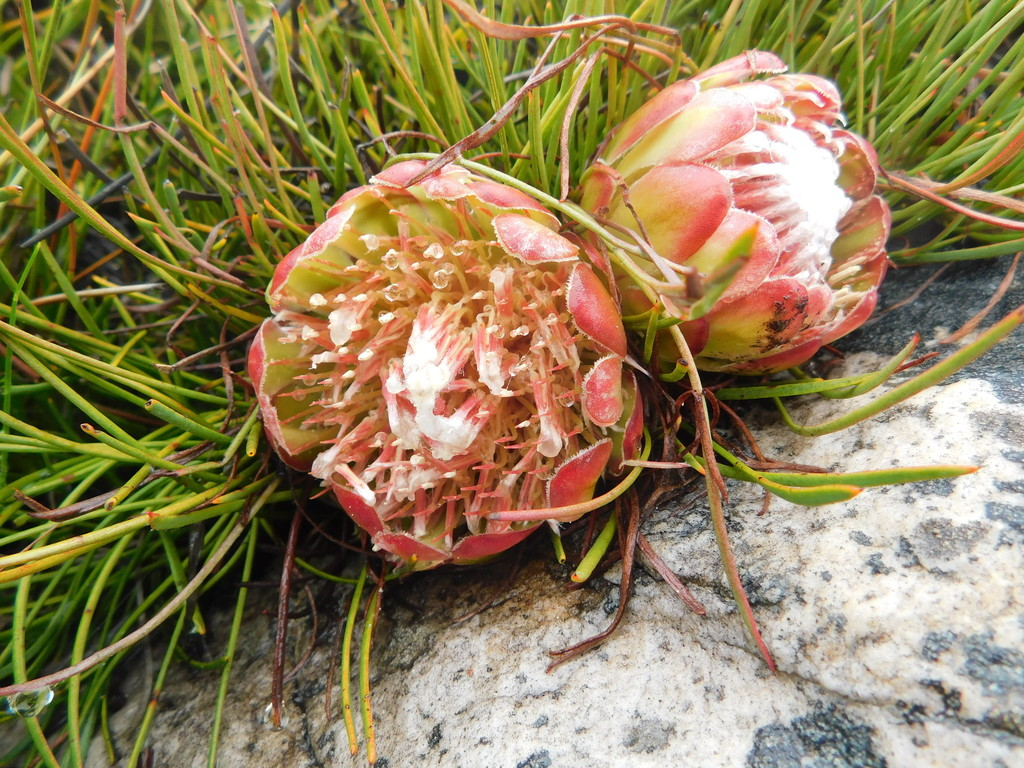
Flower heads

== Conservation ==
It is rare. Threats to its continued survival are the planting of trees (afforestation), invasive plants and a wildfire management regime which is too frequent to allow the plants time to mature and set seed.

In 2005, Bomhard et al. predicted, based on their reading of models projecting the effects of climate change, that 30% of the population of the time would be extirpated by 2020, which would then qualify the species for upgrading its conservation status from 'not threatened' to 'vulnerable' according to the IUCN conservation status standards. Bomhard et al. argued that the projected possibility of future population reduction should go to counting as actual population reduction in the present, and that species which their computer model had so designated (223 of 227) should be upgraded as much rarer. In 2009, the South African National Biodiversity Institute complied with this, and formally assessed the conservation status of the species for the Red List of South African Plants as 'vulnerable'. In the 2019 re-assessment, SANBI mischaracterises the Bomhard study and moved up the date when the species would be reduced by 30% to 2025, maintaining the conservation status as 'vulnerable'. The total population numbers were thought to be decreasing in 2019, especially on the Kammanassie Mountains.

== See also ==
- List of Protea species
