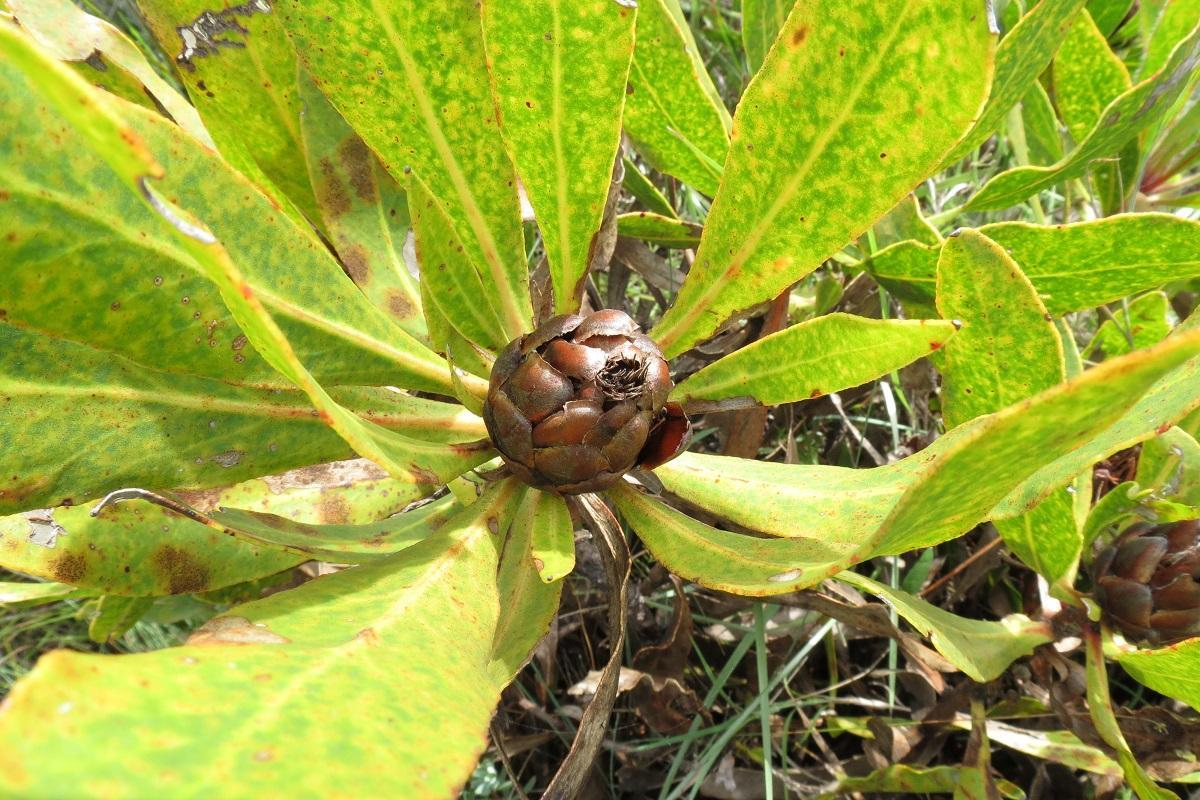
- Protea foliosa habitat view in the east of the Suurberg range

Conservation status
- Least Concern (IUCN 3.1)

Scientific classification
- Kingdom: Plantae
- Clade: Tracheophytes
- Clade: Angiosperms
- Clade: Eudicots
- Order: Proteales
- Family: Proteaceae
- Genus: Protea
- Species: P. foliosa

Binomial name
- Protea foliosa Rourke

Synonyms
- Protea magnoliifolia H.Buek in Drège, nom. nud.; Protea caulescens E.Mey. ex Meisn. in DC.: 244 (1856), nom. nud.; Protea tenax var. latifolia Meisn. in DC.: 244 (1856)

= Protea foliosa =

Species of flowering plant

Protea foliosa, also known as the leafy sugarbush, is a flowering plant of the genus Protea in the family Proteaceae which is endemic to the Cape Region of South Africa. In the Afrikaans language it is known as ruie-suikerbos.

== Taxonomy ==
This species appears to be one of the latest to be described as new to science, this by the South African botanist John Patrick Rourke in 1975, however, the species had been known since the early 19th century. Rourke had collected this species in 1974 in the Van Stadensberg Forest Reserve between the villages of Loerie and Otterford, to the west of the city of Port Elizabeth (collector #1410), but it was first discovered by the British plant collector William Burchell in 1813 in the Swartwatersberge (berge = 'mountains') near the village of Riebeek East, and collected by him again the following year on the Van Stadensberg (berg = 'mountain'). The German botanical explorer Johann Franz Drège collected the species a number of times in the early 1830s. In his 1843 work Zwei pflanzengeographische Documente Drège used two names to classify these specimens, Protea tenax (this incorrectly, Meissner calls it "var. β") and P. magnoliifolia, but this work is only an annotated travel itinerary, and does not include formal species descriptions for any of the new taxa mentioned. Another German botanical explorer, Karl Zeyher, also collected this species around the same time. His specimens were named P. caulescens by Ernst Meyer, apparently on the exsiccata specimen sheets only, and Meyer also did not publish a formal description, resulting in another 'naked' name. These names are thus what is known as nomina nuda. In the botanical book series, the Prodromus, the Swiss taxonomist Carl Meissner subsequently classified Zeyher and Drège's specimens as belonging to his taxon P. tenax var. latifolia in 1856, synonymising the nomina nuda with the new variety. Meissner ascribes the name in Drège's 1843 work to Heinrich Wilhelm Buek, to whom the name is attributed in the index at the back of the book.

P. tenax is a prostrate species which occurs in the mountain ranges much further to the west.

In 1912 in the Flora Capensis Otto Stapf and Edwin Percy Phillips confused matters further. They maintain the synonymy of Meissner, but strangely classify all of Drège's specimens as P. tenax var. tenax, and oddly enough classify specimens from other collectors who went to the exact same locations as var. latifolia. They changed the spelling of P. magnoliifolia to magnoliaefolia.

=== Types ===
Drège collected his specimens at four locations: what he called P. tenax at moderate elevations on the northern flanks of the Zuurberge and in grassland at low elevations between the villages of Omsamculo and Omtendo (now possibly in the area of Makhanda), and what he called P. magnoliifolia on the eastern flank of the Van Stadensberg (as Vanstaadesberg") at reasonably low elevations, and the nearby Galgebosch, a forest at low altitudes.

In the preparatory work for the Flora Capensis, Stapf designated a specimen of Drège stored at the Swedish Museum of Natural History, collected either on the Van Stadensberg itself or in the Galgebosch, and originally identified as P. magnoliifolia, as the holotype of P. tenax var. latifolia. At the same time, his partner in writing Phillips determined the P. magnoliifolia specimen of the same series at Kew to be the nominate P. tenax of Robert Brown. This identification was reiterated by the South African botanist Hedley Brian Rycroft in 1960, although he originally wrote the added "var. latifolia" to that, before crossing that part out.

An isotype of Rourke's 1974 collection is kept at the herbarium at Kew.

=== Higher classification ===
In 1995 Tony Rebelo classified P. foliosa in his section Crinitae (what he calls the "eastern ground sugarbushes").

== Description ==
=== Habitus ===
It is a rounded shrub reaching up to 1.5 metres (4.9 ft) tall, although the plants growing around Makhanda only become shorter than 1 metre (3.3 ft) in height at maximum, and plants are usually 45–75 centimetres (18–30 in). The shrub consists of multiple stems arising from an underground bole or persistent rootstock. These stems are thick (60–80mm in diameter), glabrous and rarely branch. Being able to survive wildfires, it is a long-lived species. The stems are erect, but the weight of the inflorescences bend them closer to the ground.

=== Leaves ===
The mature leaves are glabrescent, and lanceolate to broadly elliptic in shape.

=== Flowers ===
The inflorescences are specialised structures called pseudanthia, also known simply as flower heads, containing hundred of reduced flowers, called florets. The flower heads are surrounded by 'involucral bracts'; these bracts are coloured a greenish-cream, and at their apexes are fringed with white or beige-coloured beards of hair. It is monoecious, both sexes occur in each flower. The blooms are produced in the autumn, mostly in May to June, extending from March to September.

In this species the leaves below the inflorescence curiously wrap over it, insomuch as to obscure it from sight. It is possible that this is an evolutionary adaptation to accommodate the small mammals it uses to pollinate the florets -the stems being erect, such animals are more susceptible to predation by owls or other aerial predators, unless thus hidden by a covering of broad and stiff leaves.

=== Similar species ===
Protea foliosa is distinguished from the three other species classified in section Crinitae, P. intonsa, P. montana and P. vogtsiae, by being the one to grow in the form of a shrub with erect branches with terminal, clustered flower heads. Additionally, this is the only species in this group which has its flower heads obscured from sight by its surrounding leaves.

P. recondita, which occurs on high mountain slopes further to the west, also has terminal flower heads which are wrapped by the surrounding and subtending leaves and bracts, but in this species the single heads are bourne much higher in the air on erect branches, not near to the ground.

P. foliosa has long been confused with P. tenax the first to do so was one of the first, in the early 1830s, collectors of this plant, Drège, who published about this species partially under that name in 1843. Later authors maintained this confusion, Meissner correctly identified that the differently labelled collections were the same taxon, but he classified it as a new variety, latifolia, of P. tenax. Beginning with Phillips around 1910, and later Stapf (1912) and Rycroft (1960), both the nominate P. tenax and var. latifolia were believed to be sympatric, with both taxa being identified from different specimens made in the same locations. This situation persisted until 1975, when Rourke published his article The Protea tenax tangle. The two species are now known to be neither allopatric nor closely related.

== Distribution ==
The species is endemic to the Eastern Cape province of South Africa. It is distributed from the Elandsberg to Port Elizabeth, and Riebeek East to Makhanda (formerly Grahamstown) or the Bushman's River Poort. It is spatially distributed as either scattered individuals to being locally abundant in occurrence. It occurs over a range of 9750 km^{2} (extent of occurrence).

== Ecology ==
Protea foliosa can re-sprout from an underground bole after periodic wildfires move through its habitat. The seeds are stored in the old, dried, woody, fire-resistant infructescences (seed-heads) on the plant, and are released after two years, after fires, to be dispersed by the wind.

Although one source states that the florets of this species are pollinated by birds and insects, it has been theorised since 1977 that this action was achieved by rodents. A 2015 paper provided evidence that the main diurnal pollinator was the species Rhabdomys pumilio.

=== Habitat ===
P. foliosa is almost exclusively found in fynbos habitat, in the far east of the extent of fynbos, but around Makhanda it grows in grassland thicket. It is found in soils derived of sandstone, quartzite, or sometimes sedimentary conglomerates. It often grows at moist sites, where it may become locally abundant, at altitudes from 150 to 600 (or 610) metres.

== Conservation ==
It is locally common in its range where the habitat is suitable, and is not in danger of extinction. The population number is thought to be stable as of 2019. The species was first assessed by the South African National Biodiversity Institute for the Red List of South African Plants as 'least concern' in 2009. This assessment was reiterated in 2019.

The species is conserved in the protected areas of Longmoor Forest Area and the Van Stadensberg Forest Reserve.

== See also ==
- List of Protea species
