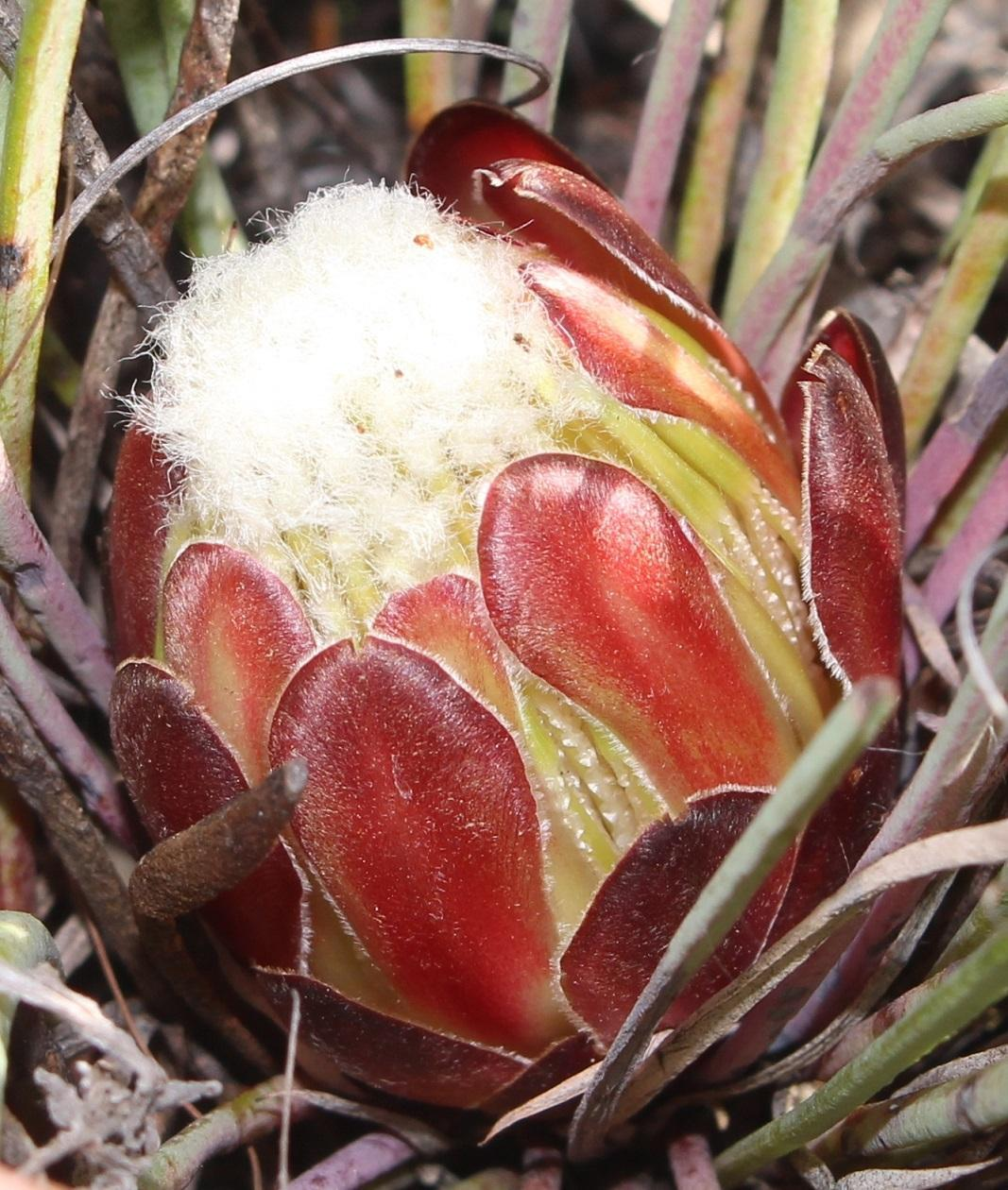
- Protea intonsa developing inflorescence

Conservation status
- Least Concern (IUCN 3.1)

Scientific classification
- Kingdom: Plantae
- Clade: Embryophytes
- Clade: Tracheophytes
- Clade: Angiosperms
- Clade: Eudicots
- Order: Proteales
- Family: Proteaceae
- Genus: Protea
- Species: P. intonsa

Binomial name
- Protea intonsa Rourke

= Protea intonsa =

Species of flowering plant

Protea intonsa, also known as the tufted sugarbush, is a species of flowering plant in the family Proteaceae, endemic to South Africa, where it is distributed from the eastern Swartberg and Kammanassie Mountains to the Baviaanskloof mountains. In Afrikaans, it is known as klossie-suikerbos.

== Taxonomy ==
Protea intonsa has only been known to exist for half a century or so, it was first described as new to science by the South African botanist John Patrick Rourke in 1971. He had first collected the species in 1967 in the Oudtshoorn Local Municipality on the rocky southeastern slopes of the Mannetjiesberg at 4,800 feet (1,500 m) elevation (collector #860).

An isotype of Rourke's original collection is housed at the herbarium at Kew.

P. intonsa was classified in Protea section Crinitae by Tony Rebelo in 1995, what he calls the "eastern ground sugarbushes", along with P. foliosa, P. montana and P. vogtsiae.

== Description ==
This plant is a small, densely branched shrub up to 30 centimetres (12 in) tall. It is acaulescent, the shrubs having the appearance of low tufts 1–2 feet (30–61 cm) in diameter. The stems (rhizomes) grow underground, and have a characteristically scaled bark. It is a long-lived species.

The leaves are linear, narrow and slightly glaucous.

The inflorescences are specialised structures called pseudanthia, also known simply as flower heads, containing hundred of reduced flowers, called florets. These inflorescences are surrounded by petal-like appendages known as 'involucral bracts'. These bracts are pale green or greenish white base colour, this being flushed with carmine. The margins of the bracts are a dull carmine, except for the apex, which is covered in a 7 mm long, white-coloured beard of hairs. It is a monoecious species, both sexes occur in each flower. The blooms are produced in late spring, between September and November.

=== Similar species ===
Protea intonsa is similar to P. vogtsiae in section Crinitae, both being dwarf shrubs with subterranean stems, and has similar leaves to P. montana, which is a larger mat-forming plant with much-branched stems growing prostrate on the ground.

== Distribution ==
Protea intonsa is endemic to the southwestern part of the Cape Region of South Africa, where it is found in the south of the area where the Western Cape and Eastern Cape provinces meet. It occurs in the eastern Swartberg, Kammanassie and Baviaanskloof mountains. It is found on the Mannetjiesberg, the highest mountain in the Kammanassie Mountains, where it occurs frequently, in patches. The species is often spatially distributed as isolated populations of scattered plants.

== Ecology ==
=== Habitat ===
It grows on dry, exposed mountain slopes at altitudes between 1,000 and 1,600 metres (3,300 and 5,200 ft). It has only been found to occur in a fynbos habitat sometimes on high mountains, or in grassy fynbos. It is usually found on a substrate derived from sandstone, but near Kango in the Swartberge it occurs on conglomerates.

=== Wildfires ===
According to one source, the wildfires which periodically move through the land in which the shrub grows destroy the adult plants, but the seeds can survive such an event, whereas a more recent source states the plants survive fires by being able to re-sprout from underground stems. The florets are pollinated by rodents. The seeds are retained in the old, dry, fire-resistant infructescence on the plant for two years, when they are finally released after fires the seeds are dispersed by the wind.

== Conservation ==
Although the range is restricted to a relatively small area, it is not threatened. The South African National Biodiversity Institute assessed the conservation status of the species for the Red List of South African Plants as 'least concern' in 2019, this assessment had first been given by the same organisation in 2009. It is not threatened by anything serious and is not in danger of extinction.

A population is protected within the Kammanassie Nature Reserve.

== See also ==
- List of Protea species
