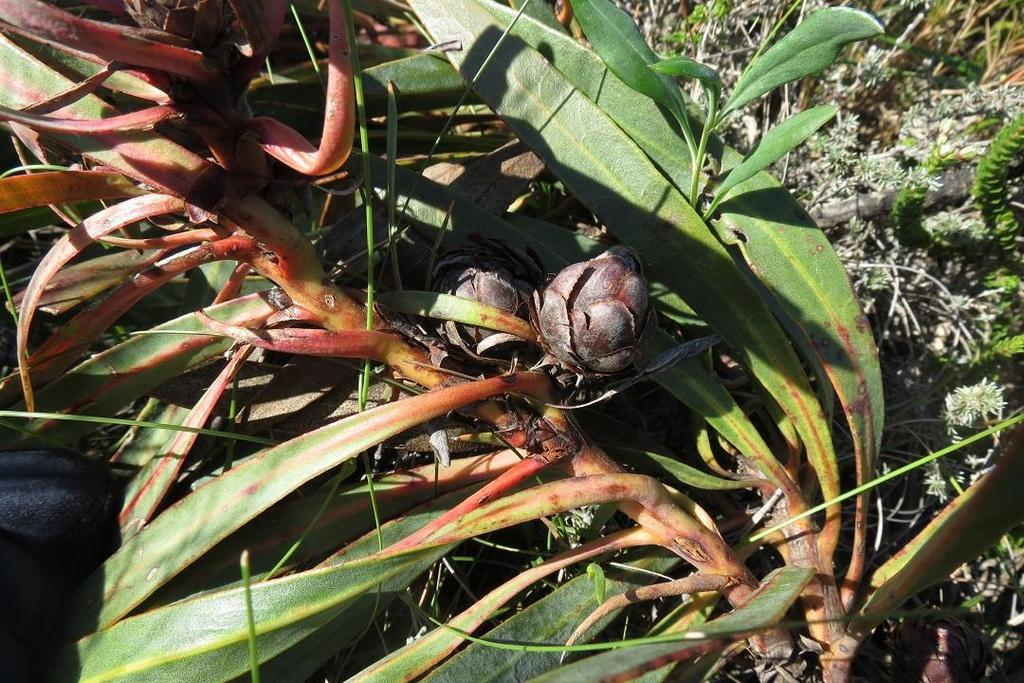

Conservation status
- Least Concern (IUCN 3.1)

Scientific classification
- Kingdom: Plantae
- Clade: Embryophytes
- Clade: Tracheophytes
- Clade: Angiosperms
- Clade: Eudicots
- Order: Proteales
- Family: Proteaceae
- Genus: Protea
- Species: P. tenax

Binomial name
- Protea tenax (Salisb.) R.Br.

= Protea tenax =

Species of flowering plant

Protea tenax also known as the tenacious sugarbush, is a species of flowering plant in the family Proteaceae endemic to the Cape Provinces of South Africa and distributed in the Outeniqua, Tsitsikamma, Kouga and Winterhoek mountains as well as the Baviaanskloof. In Afrikaans it is known as Gehardesuikerbos.

== Gallery ==
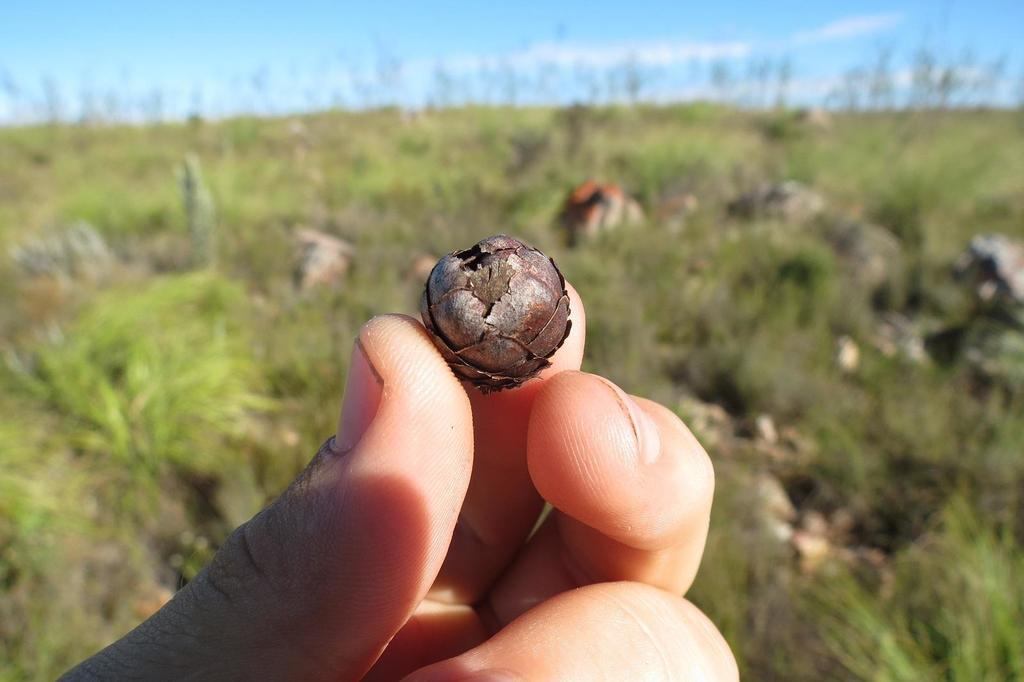
Protea tenax

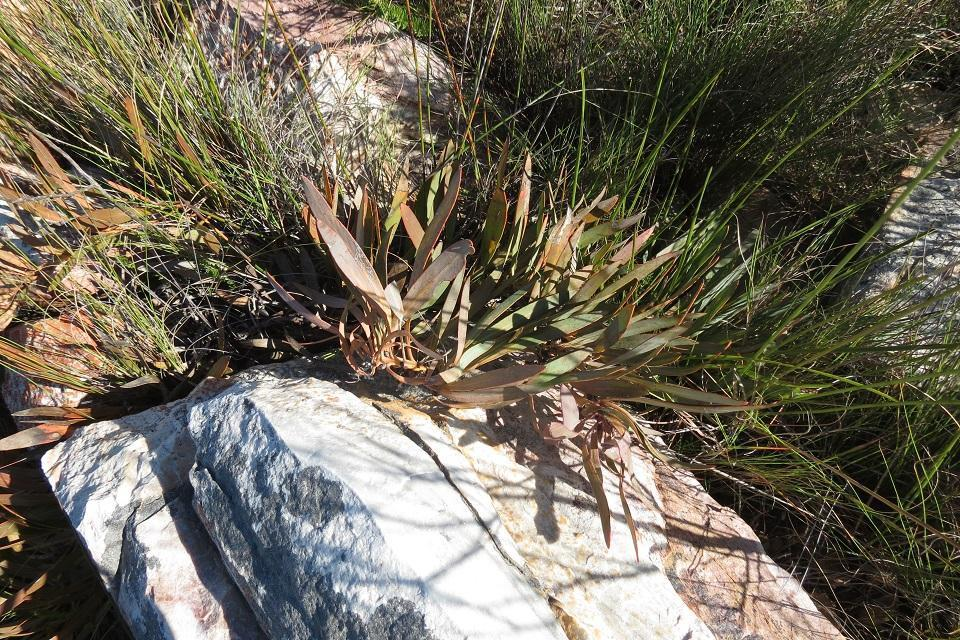
Protea tenax

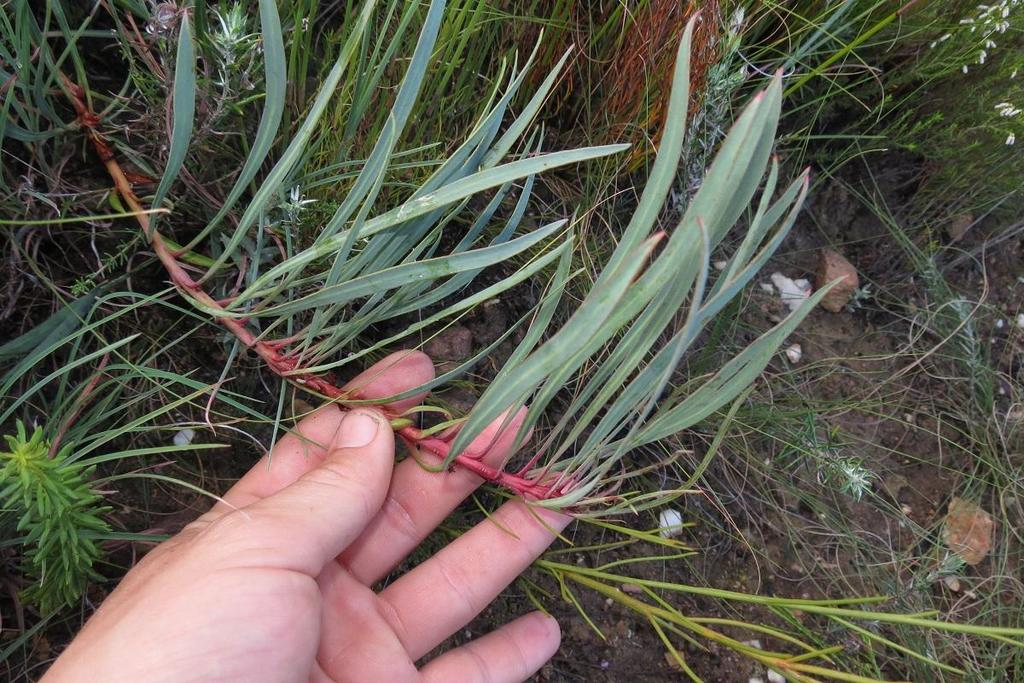
Protea tenax

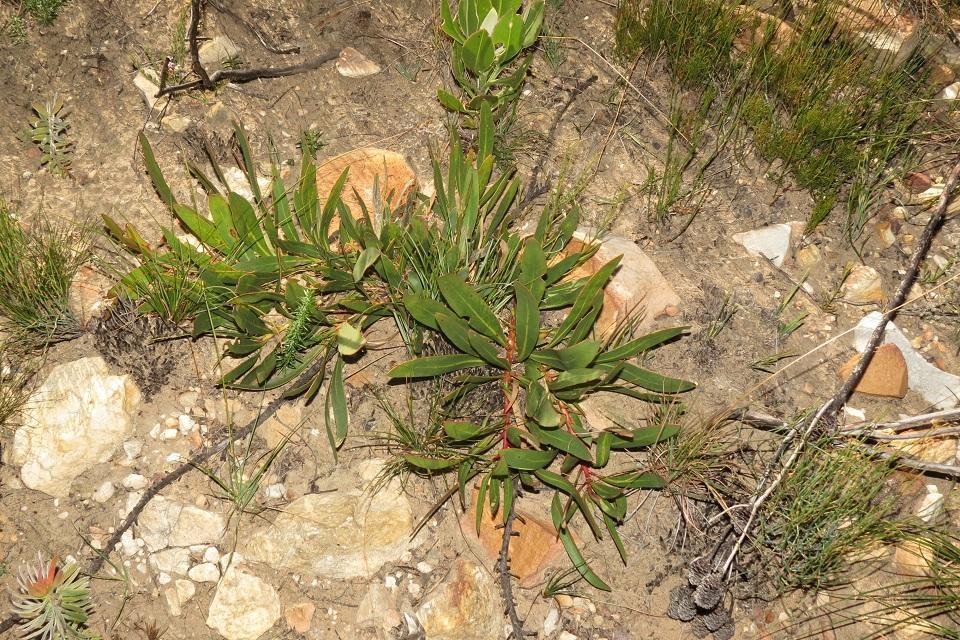
Protea tenax

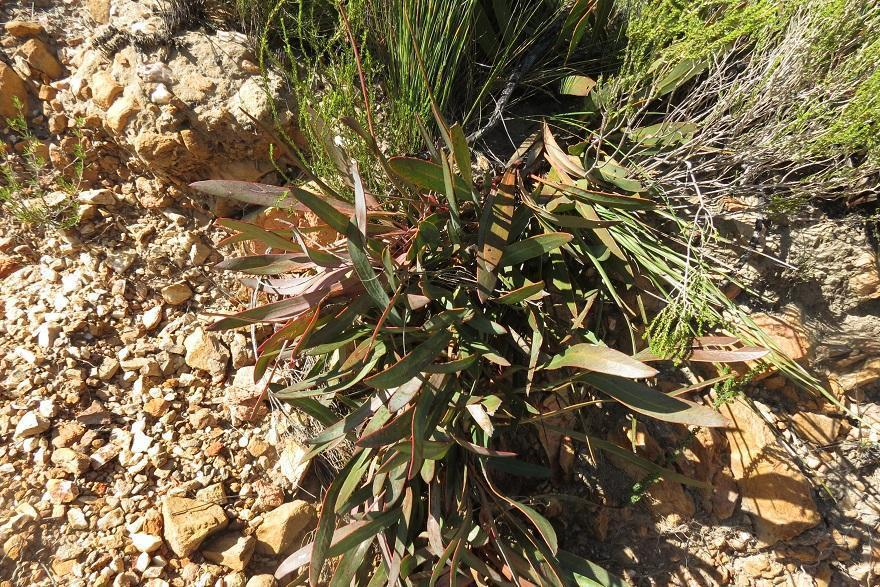
Protea tenax

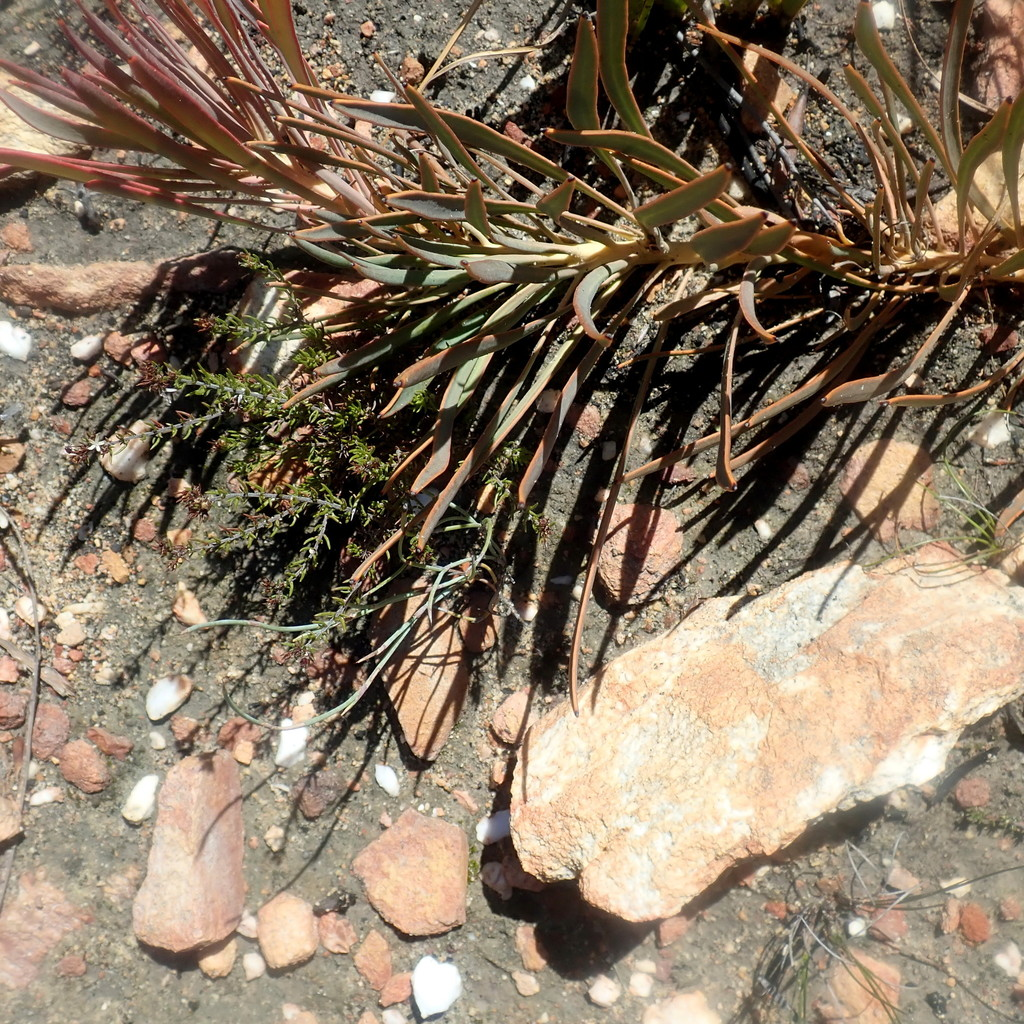
Protea tenax

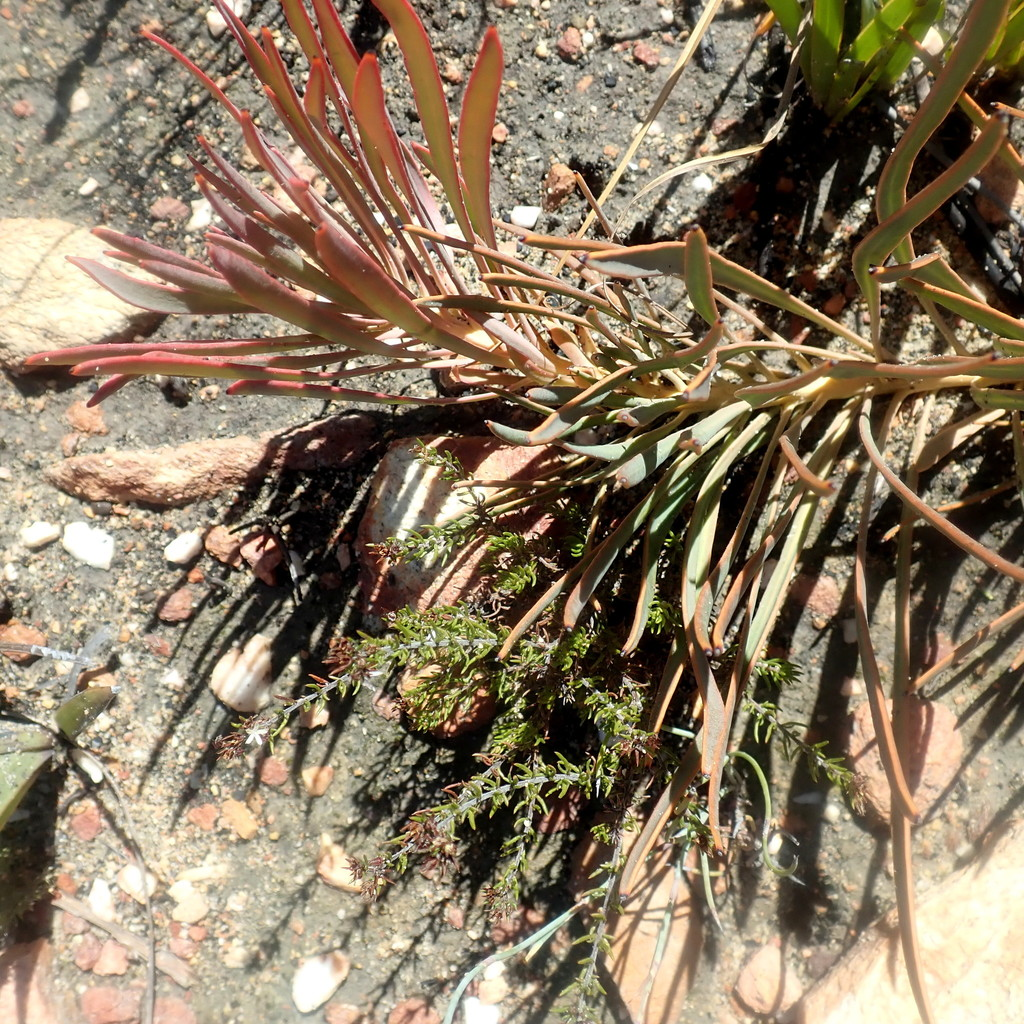
Protea tenax

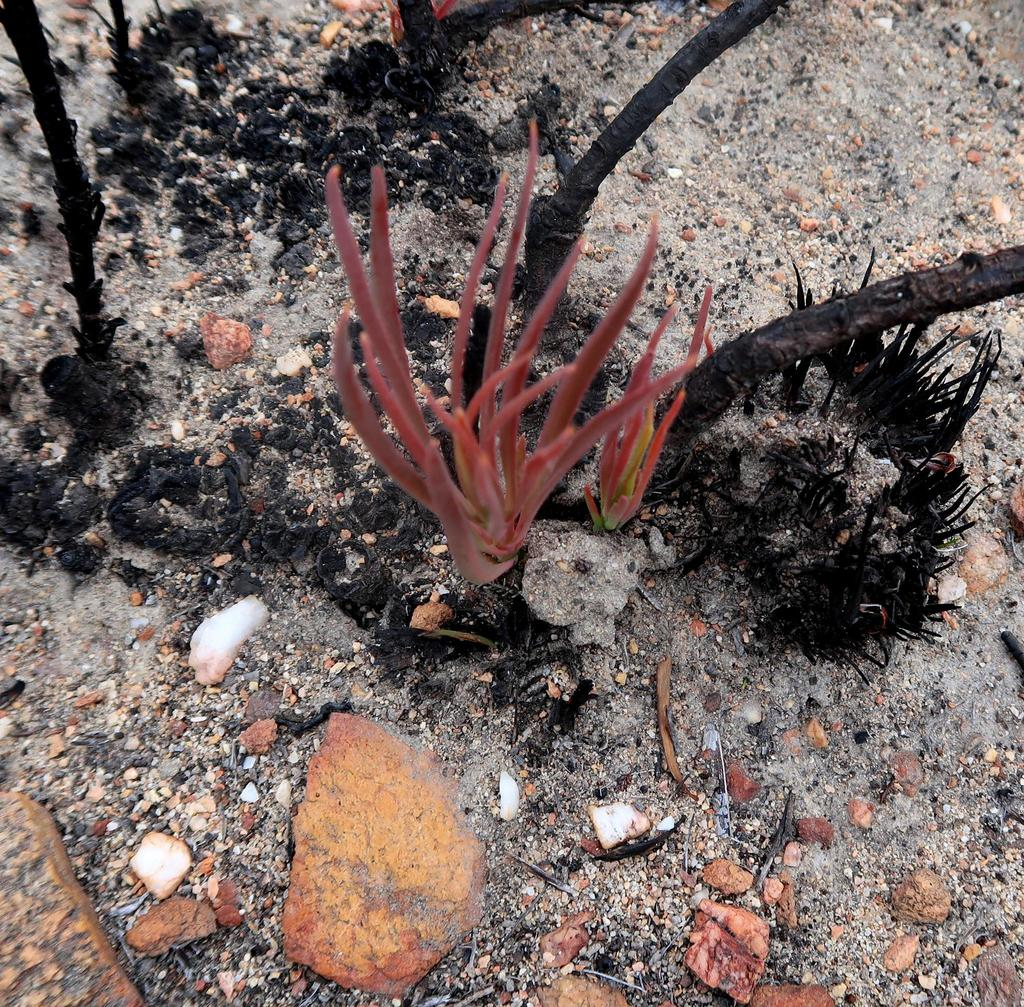
Protea tenax

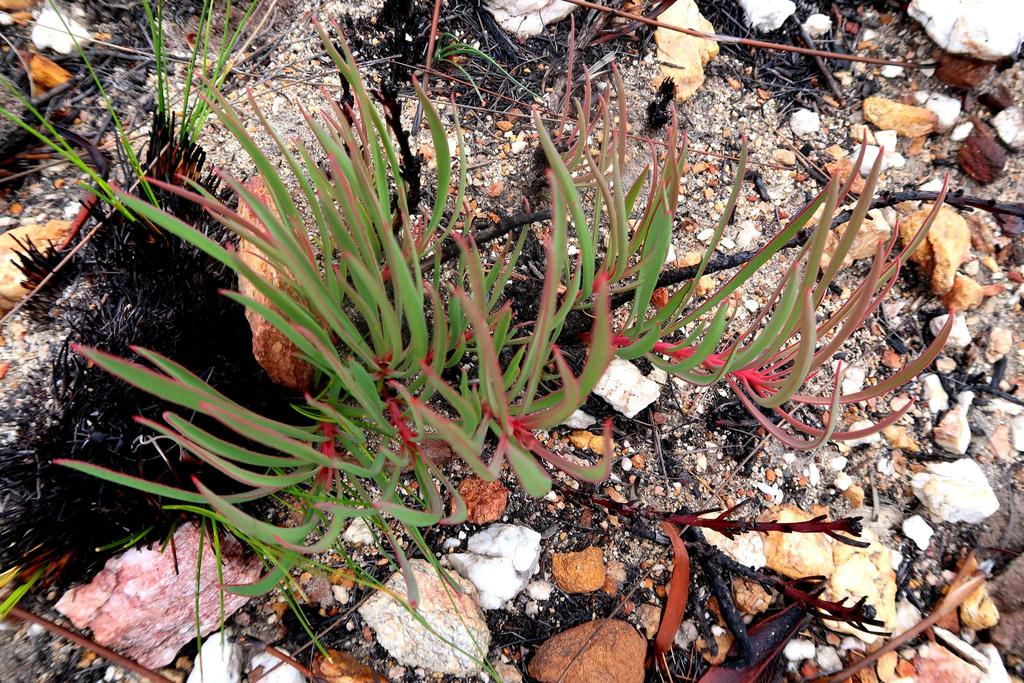
Protea tenax

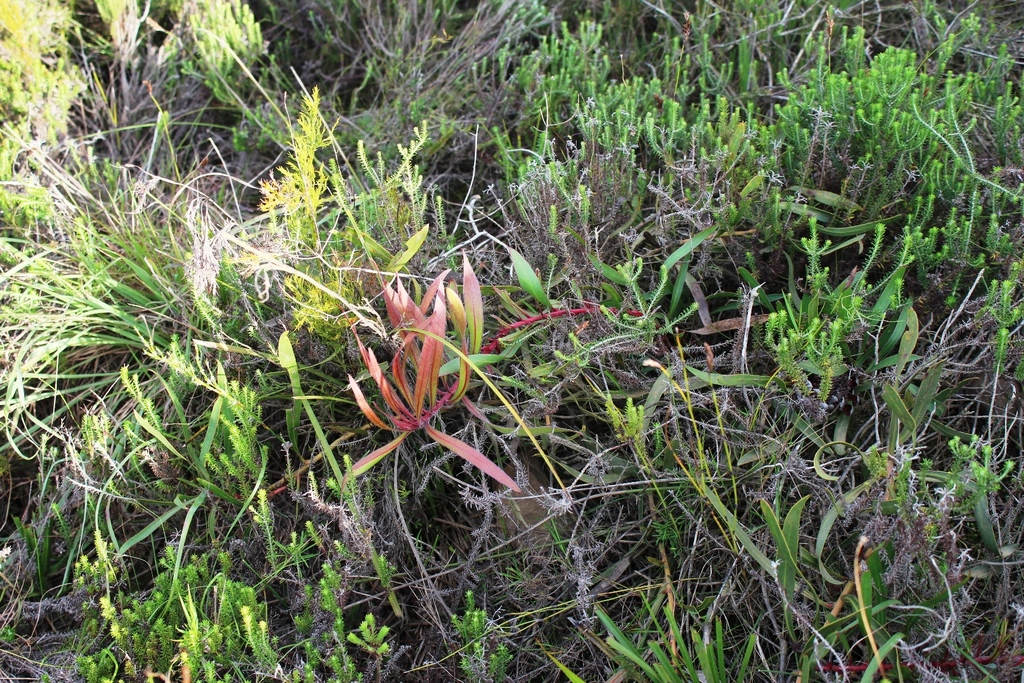
Protea tenax

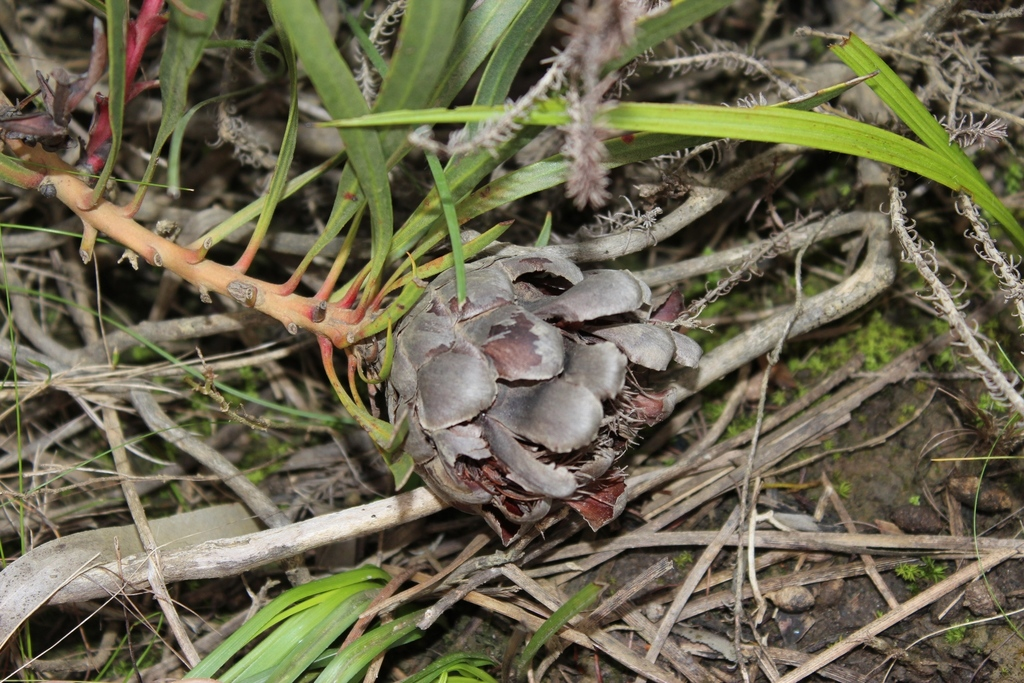
Protea tenax

== See also ==
- List of Protea species
