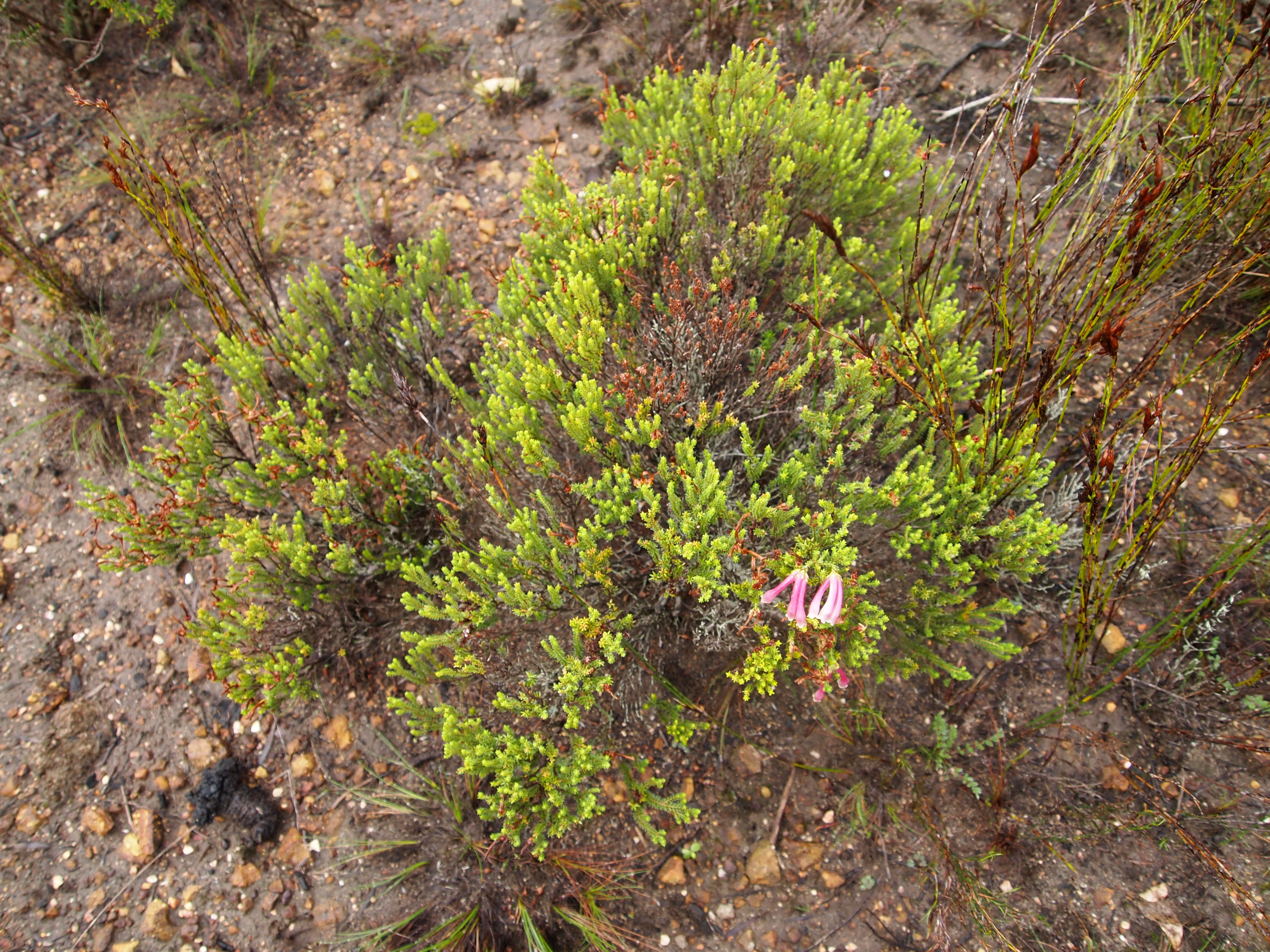

Scientific classification
- Kingdom: Plantae
- Clade: Tracheophytes
- Clade: Angiosperms
- Clade: Eudicots
- Clade: Asterids
- Order: Ericales
- Family: Ericaceae
- Genus: Erica
- Species: E. discolor

Binomial name
- Erica discolor Andrews (1794)

Synonyms
- Ericoides discolor (Andrews) Kuntze

= Erica discolor =

Species of flowering plant

Erica discolor, the two-colour heath, is a plant that belongs to the genus Erica and forms part of the fynbos. The species is endemic to the Eastern and Western Cape; from Betty's Bay to Humansdorp.
