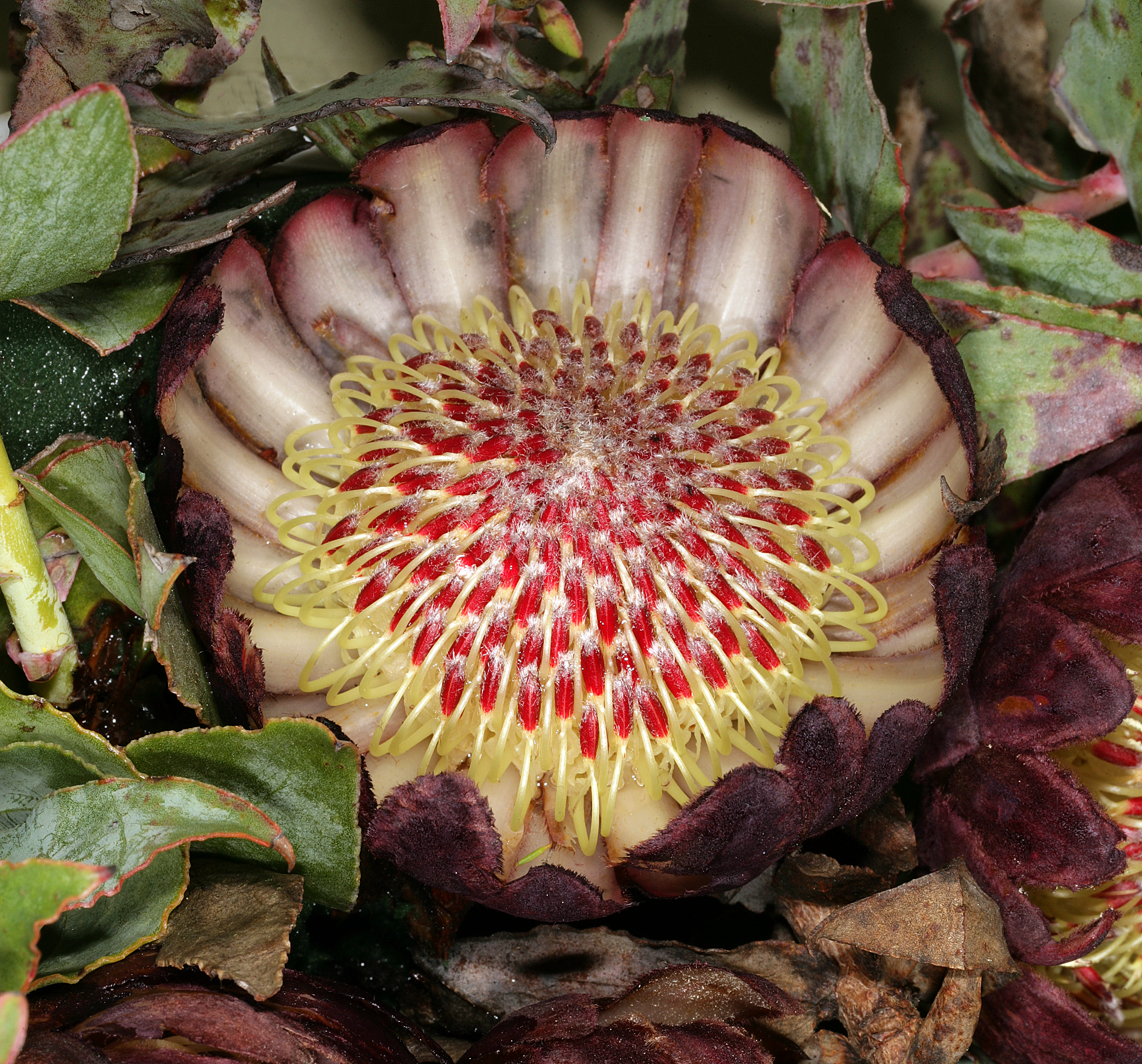

Conservation status
- Least Concern (IUCN 3.1)

Scientific classification
- Kingdom: Plantae
- Clade: Tracheophytes
- Clade: Angiosperms
- Clade: Eudicots
- Order: Proteales
- Family: Proteaceae
- Genus: Protea
- Species: P. amplexicaulis

Binomial name
- Protea amplexicaulis (Salisb.) R.Br.

= Protea amplexicaulis =

Species of plant

Protea amplexicaulis, the clasping-leaf sugarbush, is a flower-bearing shrub that belongs to the genus Protea. The plant is endemic to the Cape Provinces of South Africa and occurs from Citrusdal to the Kogelberg, as well as in the Langeberg. The shrub remains low and spreads out, becoming 1.3 m in diameter and flowering from June to September.

Fire destroys the plant but the seeds survive. The seeds are stored in a shell and spread by the wind. The plant is unisexual. Pollination takes place by the action of rats and mice. The plant grows sandstone soils at elevations of 180 to 1,600 m.

In Afrikaans it is known as ′aardroos-suikerbos′.

== Gallery ==
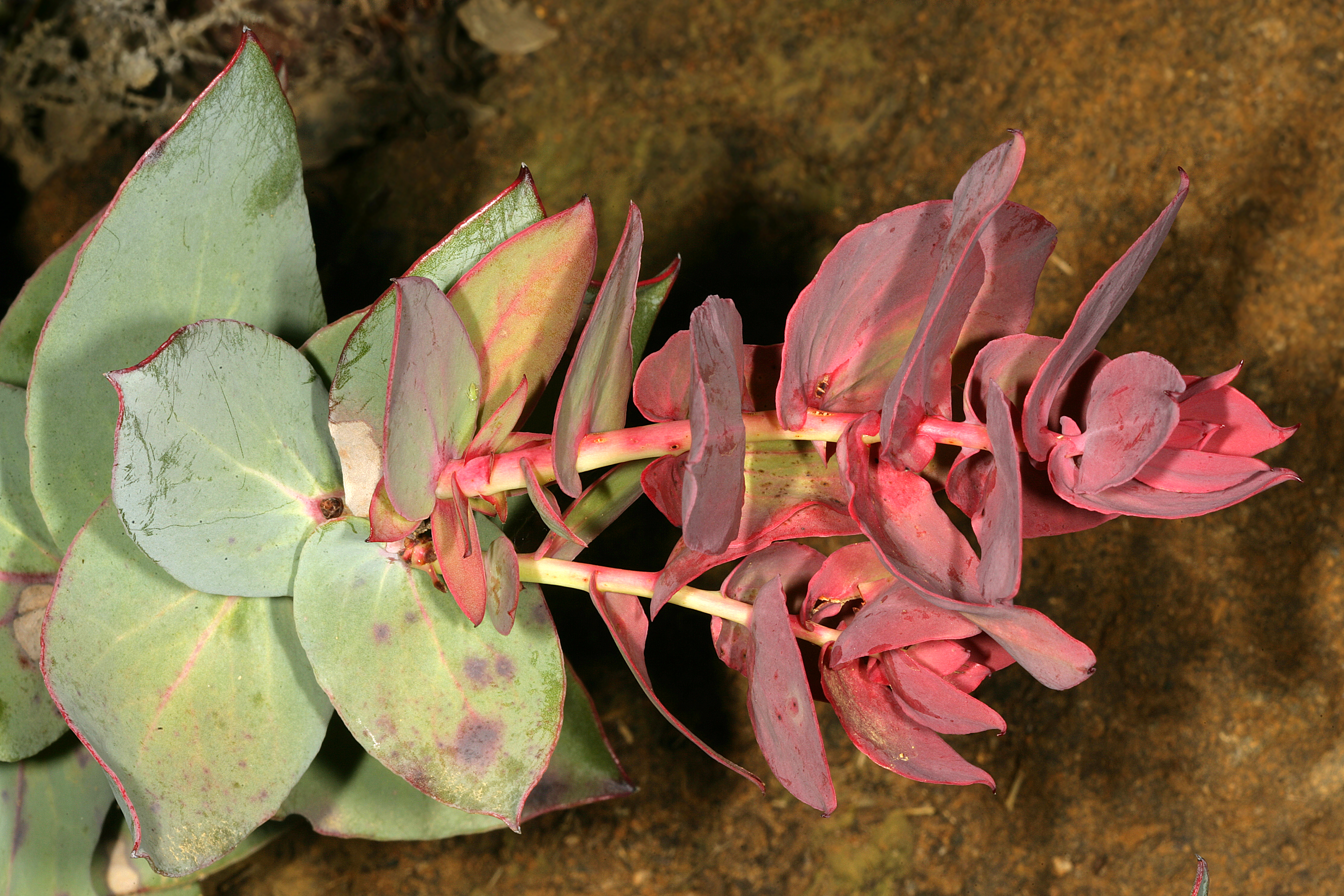

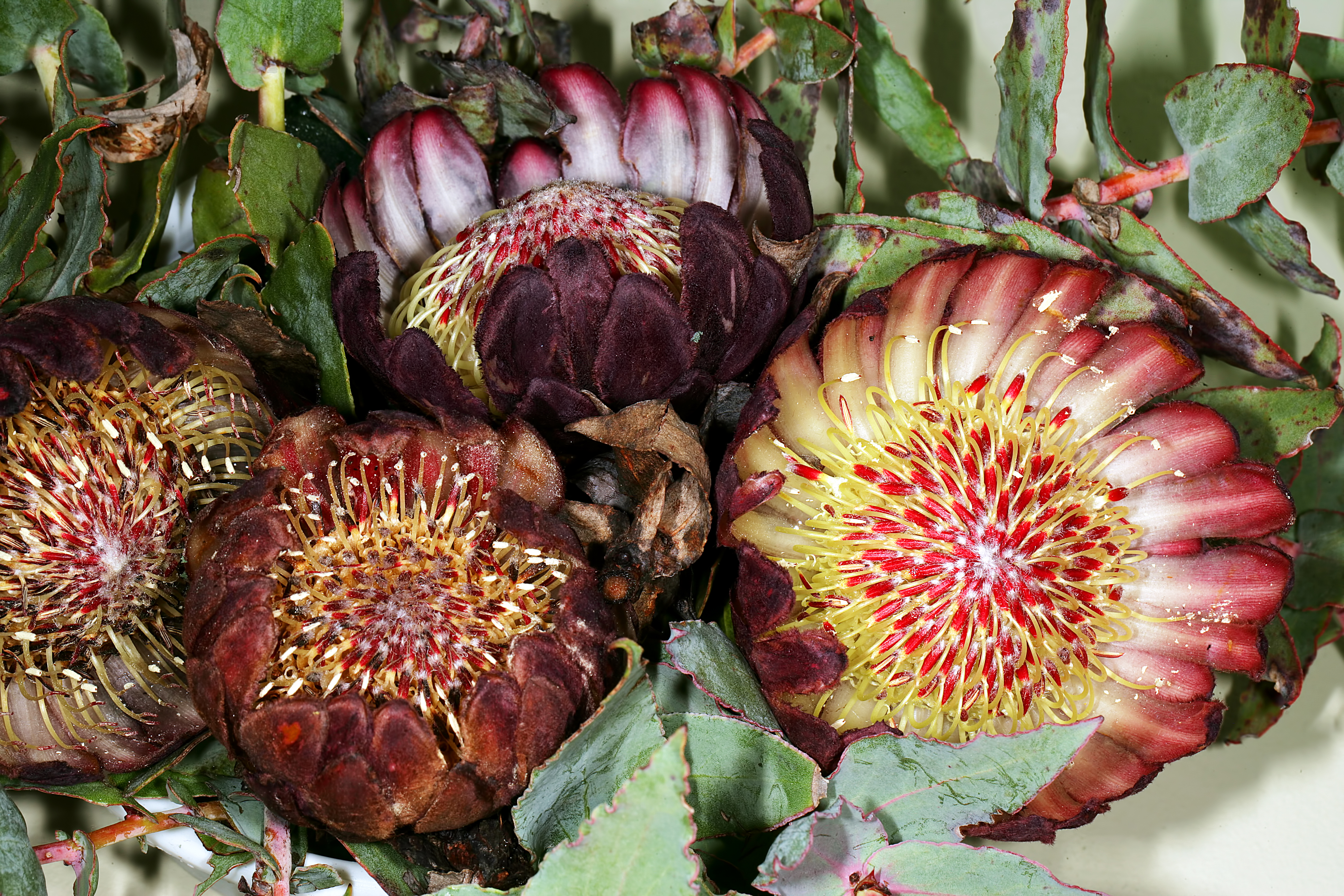

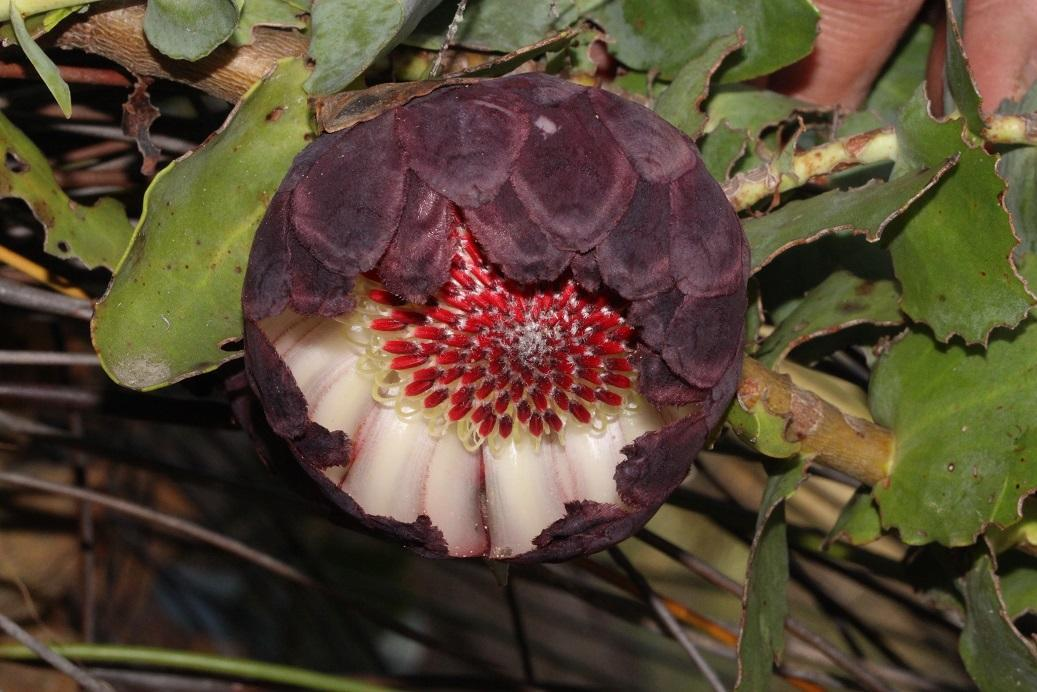

== See also ==
- List of Protea species
