= Baviaanskloof Wilderness Areas =

Conservation area in Eastern Cape, South Africa

Baviaanskloof Wilderness Areas is the name of a protected area in Eastern Cape, South Africa. It is a 174 400 hectare conservation area recognised in 2004 as a World Heritage Site. Baviaanskloof is derived from the Dutch for valley of baboons.
