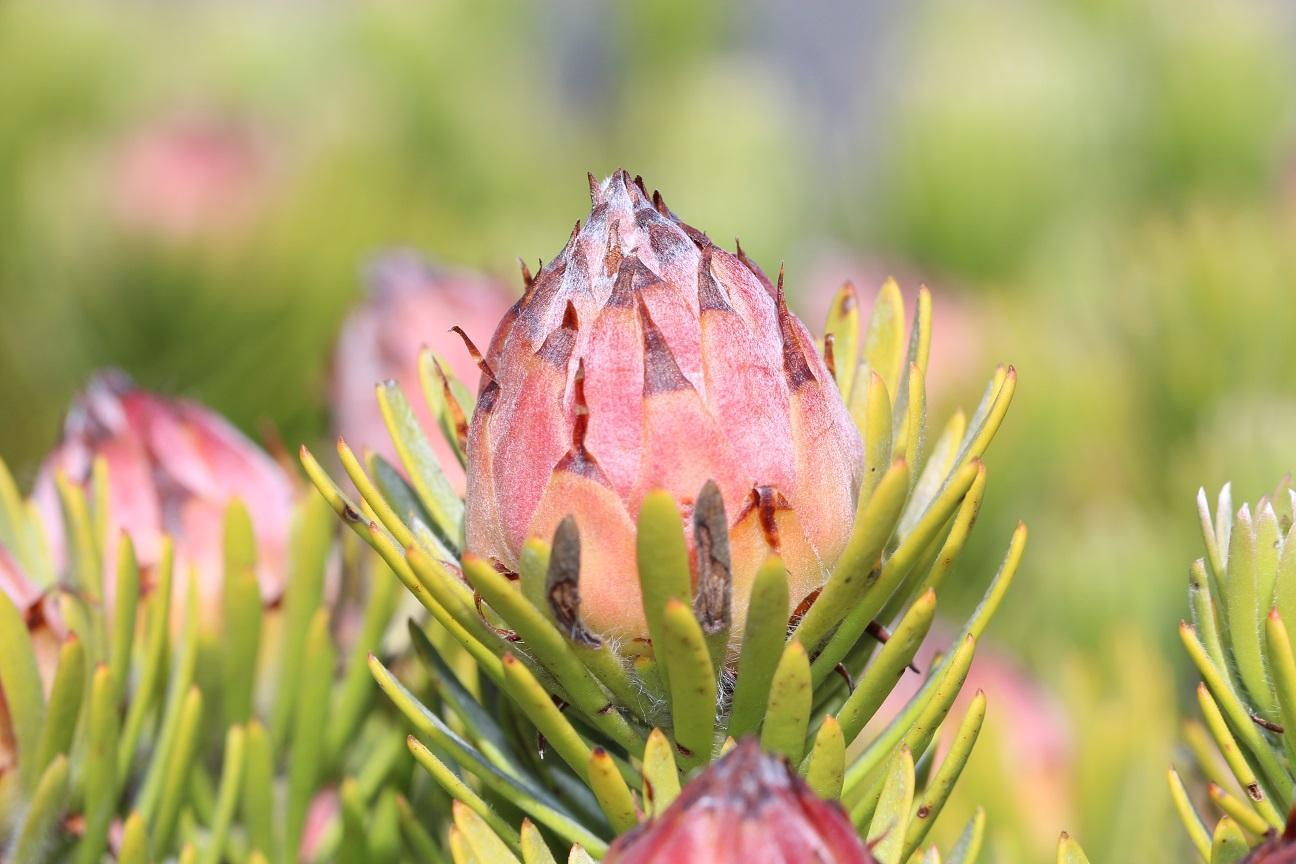

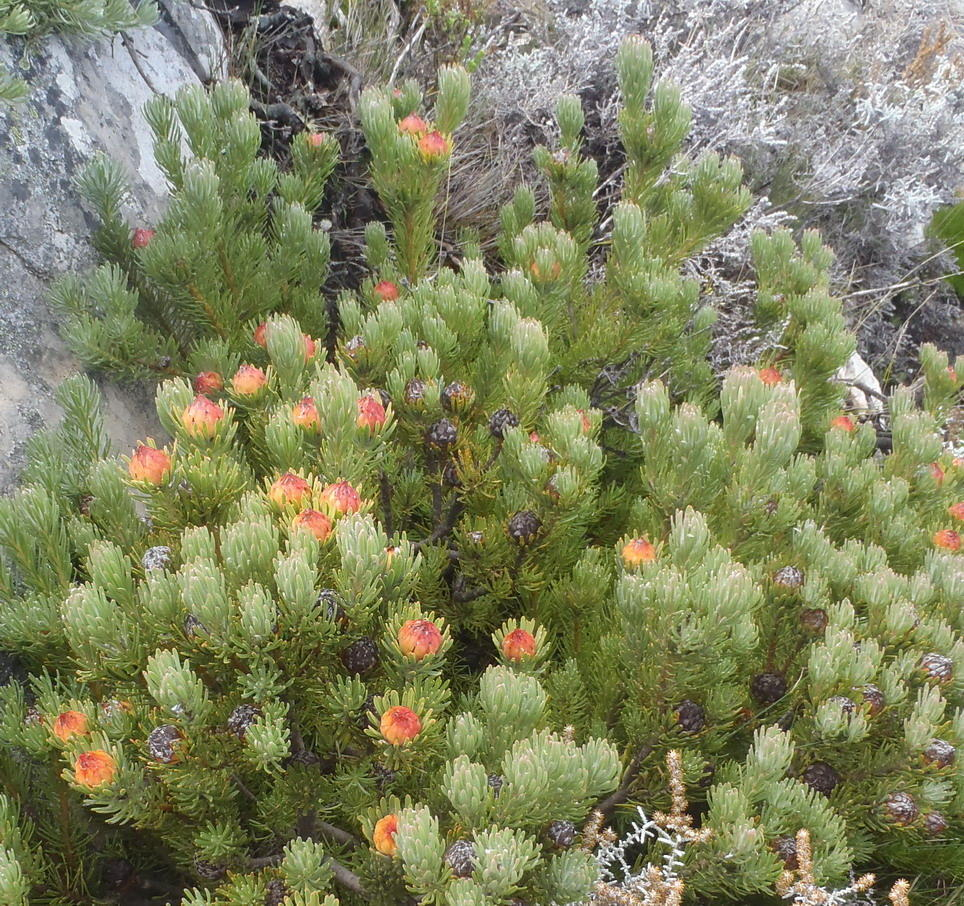

Conservation status
- Endangered (IUCN 3.1)

Scientific classification
- Kingdom: Plantae
- Clade: Tracheophytes
- Clade: Angiosperms
- Clade: Eudicots
- Order: Proteales
- Family: Proteaceae
- Genus: Leucadendron
- Species: L. dregei

Binomial name
- Leucadendron dregei E.Mey. ex Meisn.

= Leucadendron dregei =

Species of plant

Leucadendron dregei, the summit conebush, is a flower-bearing shrub belonging to the genus Leucadendron and forms part of the fynbos. The plant is native to the Western Cape, South Africa.

== Description ==
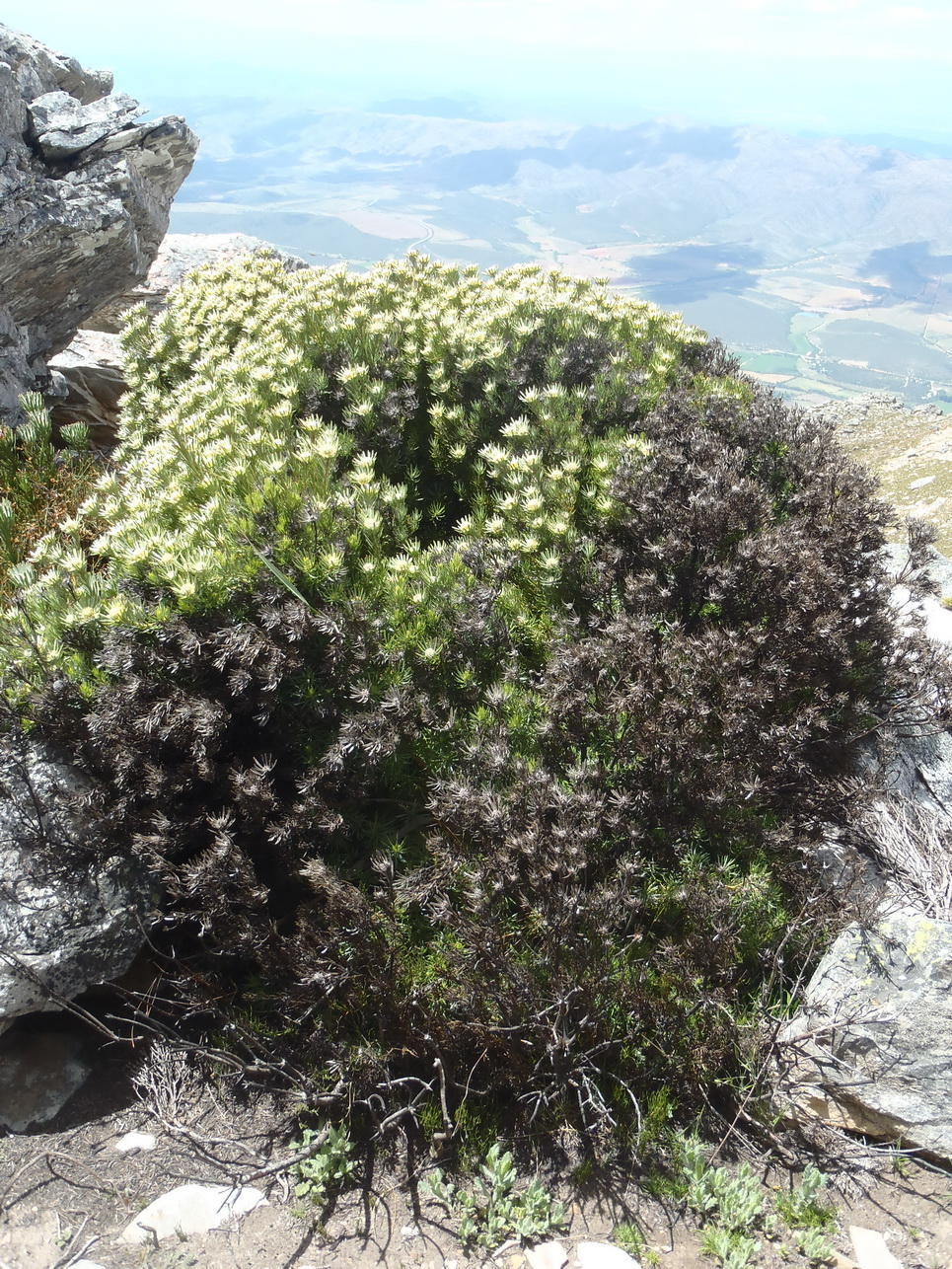

The shrub grows up to 0.6 m (2.0 ft) tall and flowers from November to December. Fire destroys the plant but the seeds survive. The seeds are stored in a toll on the female plant and are released in hot weather and are dispersed by the wind. The plant is unisexual and there are male and female plants. Small towers do the pollination. The species is rare, grows slowly and experiences too many fires for good reproduction.

In Afrikaans, it is known as oranjetolbos.

== Distribution and habitat ==
The plant occurs in the Swartberg from Touwsberg to Meiringspoort. It grows mainly on southern mountain slopes at altitudes of 1,500–2,000 m (4,900–6,600 ft).
