= Regional Red List =

Report of status of species in a certain area

A Regional Red List is a report of the threatened status of species within a certain country or region. It is based on the IUCN Red List of Threatened Species — an inventory of the conservation status of species on a global scale. Regional Red Lists assess the risk of extinction to species within a political management unit and therefore may feed directly into national and regional planning. This project is coordinated by the Zoological Society of London, the World Conservation Union (IUCN) and partners in national governments, universities and organizations throughout the world.

Regional Red Lists may assist countries or regions in:

- Determining the conservation status and trends of species
- Identifying species or ecosystems under greatest threat
- Informing conservation planning and priority setting
- Raising awareness of threatened species

== Assessing extinction risk on a regional scale ==
The IUCN Categories and Criteria were initially designed to assess the conservation status of species globally, however there was a demand for guidelines to apply the system at the regional level. In 2003, IUCN developed a set of transparent, quantitative criteria to assess the conservation status of species at the regional and national level. This approach is now being applied in many countries throughout the world.

Recently, Regional Red Lists have been completed for Mongolian Mammals and Fishes. These have also been accompanied by Summary Conservation Action Plans, detailing recommended conservation measures for each threatened species.

== Creating a Regional Red List ==
A Regional Red List may be created by any country or organisation by following the clear, repeatable protocol. The process is as follows:

1. All information relevant to a species conservation status is collected, including species distribution, population trend information, habitat, ecology and life history information, threats to the species and conservation measures currently in place.
2. A conservation assessment is made, using the IUCN Regional Categories and Criteria.
3. A regional workshop is held in which experts review the assessments, make any corrections necessary and add additional information.
4. The assessments are then collated into a Regional Red List document.
5. A Summary Conservation Action Plan may also be created.

== Towards 2010 targets ==
IUCN Red List categories: EX (Extinct); EW (Extinct in the Wild); CR (Critically Endangered); EN (Endangered); VU (Vulnerable); NT (Near Threatened); LC (Least Concern)

In April 2002 at the Convention on Biological Diversity (CBD), 188 nations committed themselves to actions to "...achieve, by 2010, a significant reduction of the current rate of biodiversity loss at the global, regional and national levels...".

When a Regional Red List is compiled at regular intervals, it can provide information about how the status of the region's biodiversity is changing over time. This information may be useful to policy makers, conservationists, and the general public, as it may assist countries in meeting their obligations to the CBD.

== Building the Regional Red List Network ==
Currently, a global network of countries and individuals working on Regional Red Lists is being developed. This will include a centralised online database where Regional Red List assessments and Action Plans can be stored, managed, and made accessible. With this regional network there will be opportunities to learn from each other's experiences in applying the IUCN Categories and Criteria and in using this information for conservation planning and priority setting.

== British reviews of conservation status ==
The British Red Data Books were produced between 1977 and 1999 by two public bodies in Britain, originally by the Nature Conservancy Council (NCC). After an agency reorganization in 1991, the project was taken over by the Joint Nature Conservation Committee (JNCC). British Red Data Books: 1. Vascular plants was published in 1977 by NCC (a 3rd edition was published in 1999 by JNCC). British Red Data Books: 2. Insects was published in 1987 by NCC, followed by British Red Data Books: 3. Invertebrates other than insects in 1991 by JNCC. After the massive 1987 publication of volume 2 on insects, the agencies understood that updating the status of over 20,000 British insect species in a single book was too unwieldy, and they started publishing individual "Species Status" reviews for specific groups of insects (e.g., a separate Red List just for Butterflies, another for Water Beetles, etc..) In 2016 the JNCC produced a spreadsheet which incorporated these reviews and lists of threatened species based on other criteria such as Biodiversity Action Plan Priority Lists and Schedules of the Wildlife & Countryside Act.

Natural England uses the following definitions for uncommon species not rare enough to be included in the Red Data Book:

Nationally important site for a species is one which has more than 1% of the British population.
Internationally important site for a species is one which has more than 1% of the north-west European population.
Nationally scarce species are those which occur in 16–100 10 km squares in Great Britain
Nationally rare species are those which occur in 1–15 10 km squares in Great Britain.
