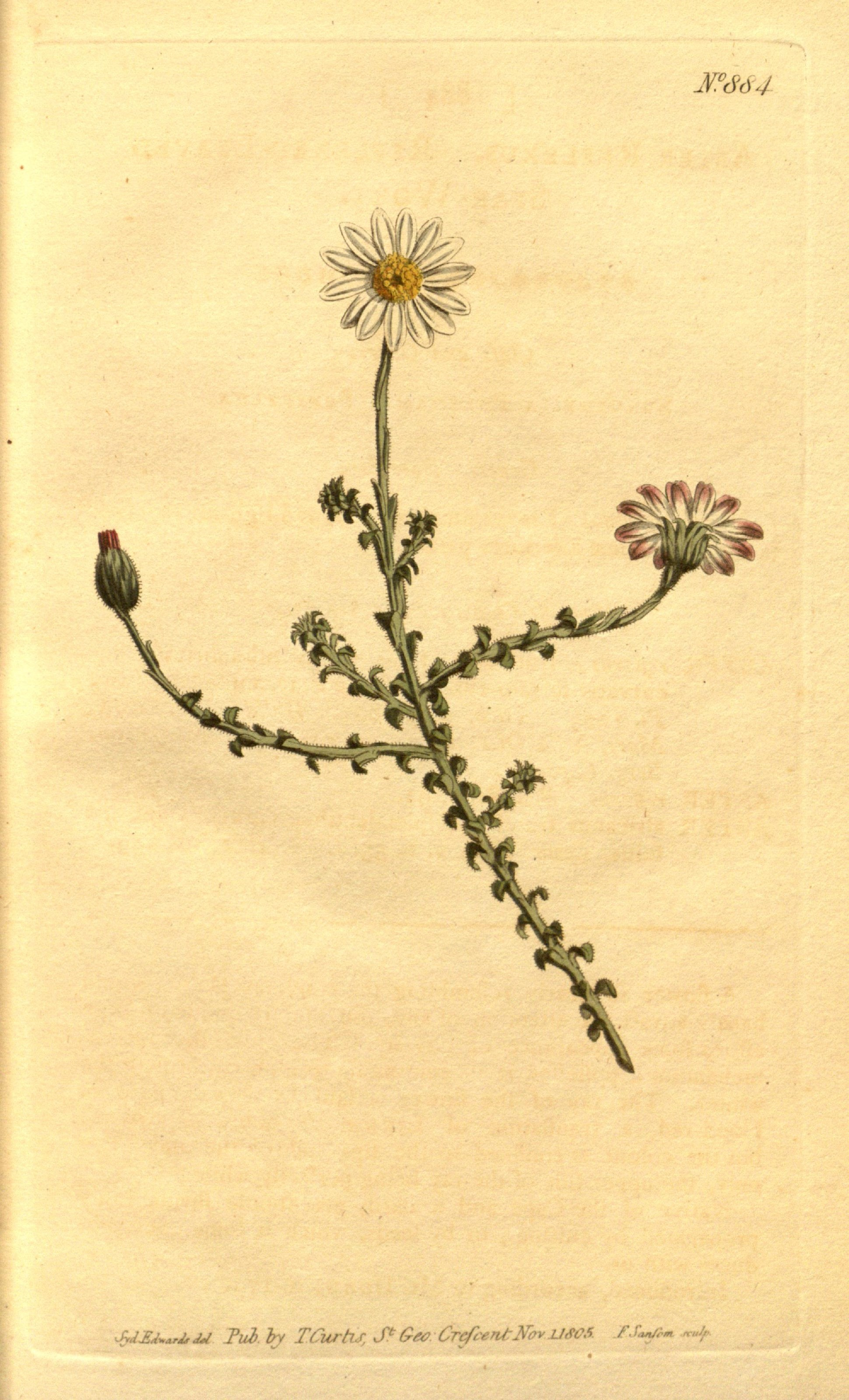
- Polyarrhena reflexa

Scientific classification
- Kingdom: Plantae
- Clade: Tracheophytes
- Clade: Angiosperms
- Clade: Eudicots
- Clade: Asterids
- Order: Asterales
- Family: Asteraceae
- Subfamily: Asteroideae
- Tribe: Astereae
- Subtribe: Homochrominae
- Genus: Polyarrhena; Cass.

Type species
- Polyarrhena reflexa (L.) Cass.

Species and subspecies
- P. imbricata; P. prostata; subsp. dentata; subsp. prostata; P. reflexa; subsp. brachyphylla; subsp. reflexa; P. stricta

= Polyarrhena =

Genus of plants

Polyarrhena is a genus of low, branching shrublets that is assigned to the daisy family (Compositae or Asteraceae). Its stems are alternately and densely set with entire or somewhat toothed leaves. Like in almost all Asteraceae, the individual flowers are 5-merous, small and clustered in typical heads, and which are surrounded by an involucre of in this case three whorls of bracts. In Polyarrhena, the centre of the head is taken by yellow disc florets, and is surrounded by one single whorl of white ligulate florets that have a pinkish-purple wash on the underside. These florets sit on a common base (or receptacle) and are not individually subtended by a bract (or palea). The species occur in the Cape Floristic Region. Polyarrhena reflexa has long been cultivated as an ornamental and is often known under its synonym Aster reflexum.

== Taxonomy ==
In his famous work Species Plantarum, Carl Linnaeus described Aster reflexus, which was the first valid scientific description of a species that is now assigned to the genus Polyarrhena. Carl Peter Thunberg thought this species would be better placed in Chrysocoma. In the Dictionnaire des Sciences Naturelles, volume 56, that was published in 1828, French Asteraceae specialist Henri Cassini erected the genus Polyarrhena, and named the type species Polyarrhena reflexa, that was based on Aster reflexus. The genus name is a contraction of πολύς "many", and ἄῤῥην "male", which Cassini chose because he said it fitted this genus. Christian Friedrich Lessing in 1832 assigned P. reflexa to his new genus Elphegea, with two other species that have sterile disc florets, E. bergeriana (now Felicia bergeriana) and E. ciliata (now Zyrphelis taxifolia), Nees von Esenbeck in the following year retained Polyarrhena, but Augustin Pyramus de Candolle included P. reflexa in Felicia in 1835, while Irish botanist William Henry Harvey in 1865 reenlisted the species under Aster. Jürke Grau in his review of the genus extended Polyarrhena by reassigning Felicia imbricata, and describing two new species, Polyarrhena prostrata and P. stricta, and two new subspecies, P. reflexa subsp. brachyphylla and P. prostrata subsp. dentata.

== Description ==
The species belonging to the genus Polyarrhena are shrublets, creeping with up to 40 cm (16 in) long branches in P. prostratum, or with ascending to erect stems of between 15 cm (5.9 in) in P. imbricata, 30 cm (12 in) in P. stricta, 15 cm (5.9 in) in P. reflexa. Three types of hairs can be found on these plants, stiff bristles with several cells at their base, thin hairs consisting of several rows of cells and short glandular hairs. The branches are mostly densely set with alternate leaves entire or weakly toothed margins, densely hairy or soon becoming hairless. The heads stand individually at the tip of side branches, which sometimes themselves occur in clusters. A leafless inflorescence stem (or peduncle) may be present or absent. The centre of the heads is taken by only male, only bisexual, yellow disc florets or a mixture of the two, which is encircled by one row of female white ligulate florets, that have a pinkish purple wash on the reverse, have a pointy tip without teeth. The style has triangular appendages. The dull brown to yellowish, indehiscent one-seeded fruits (called cypselas) have no short hairs over their surface, have two vascular bundles along their edges, are crowned by one row of bone-colored, soft hairs (or pappus)with short teeth along their length that easily detach. Near the tip of the cypsela is also a hornlike ring of about 1 mm (0.039 in) high.

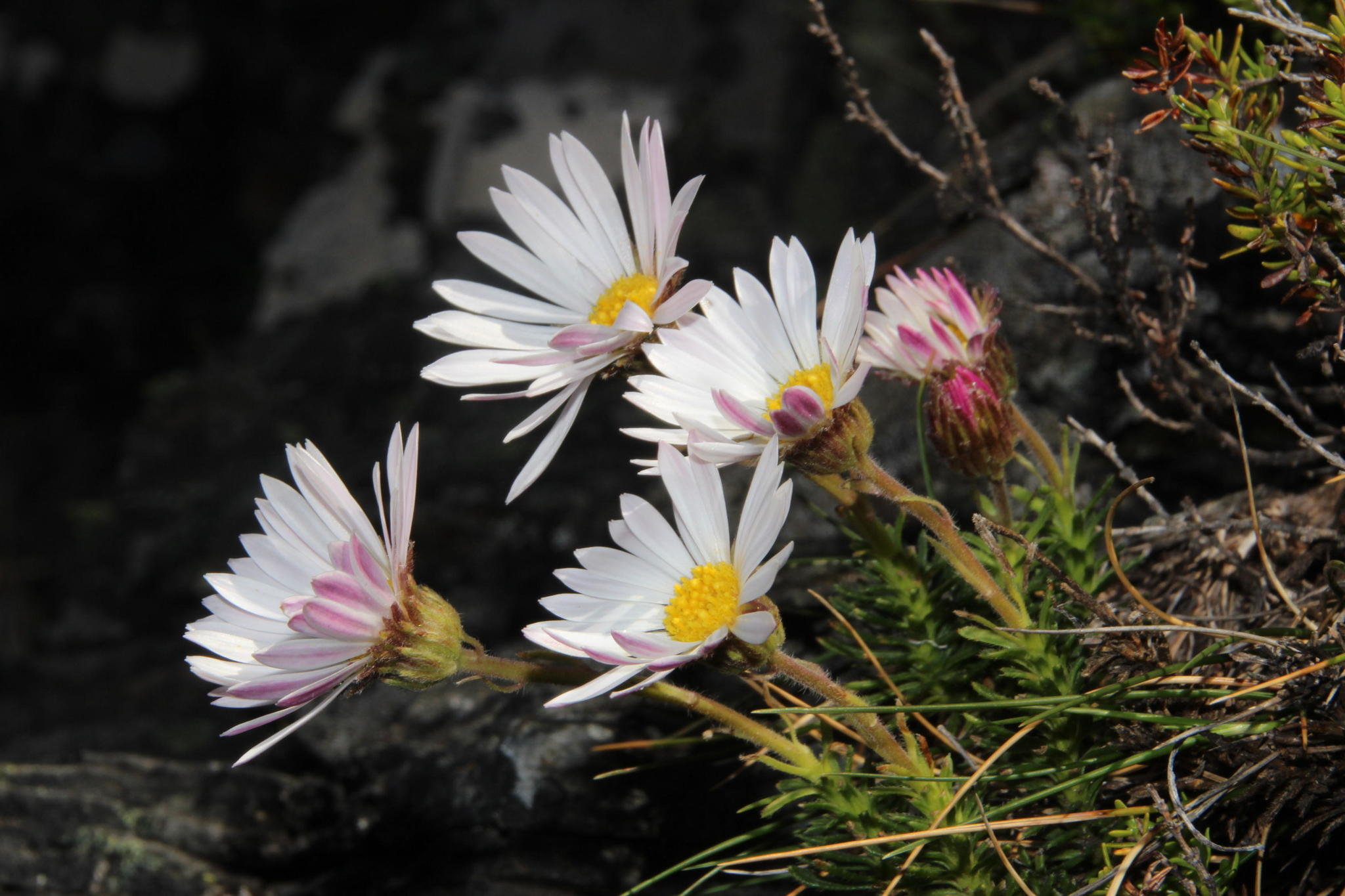
P. imbricata

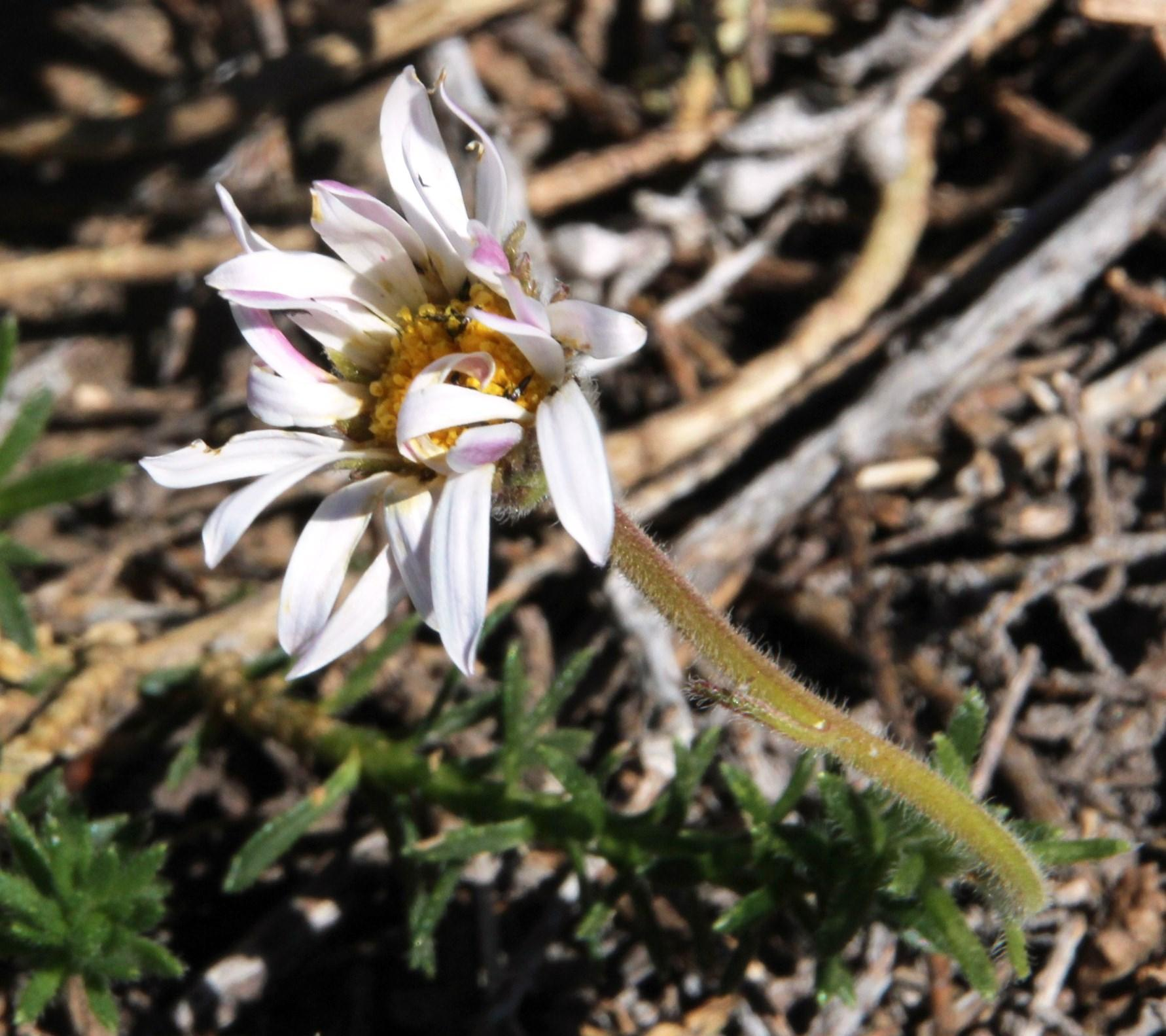
P. prostrata

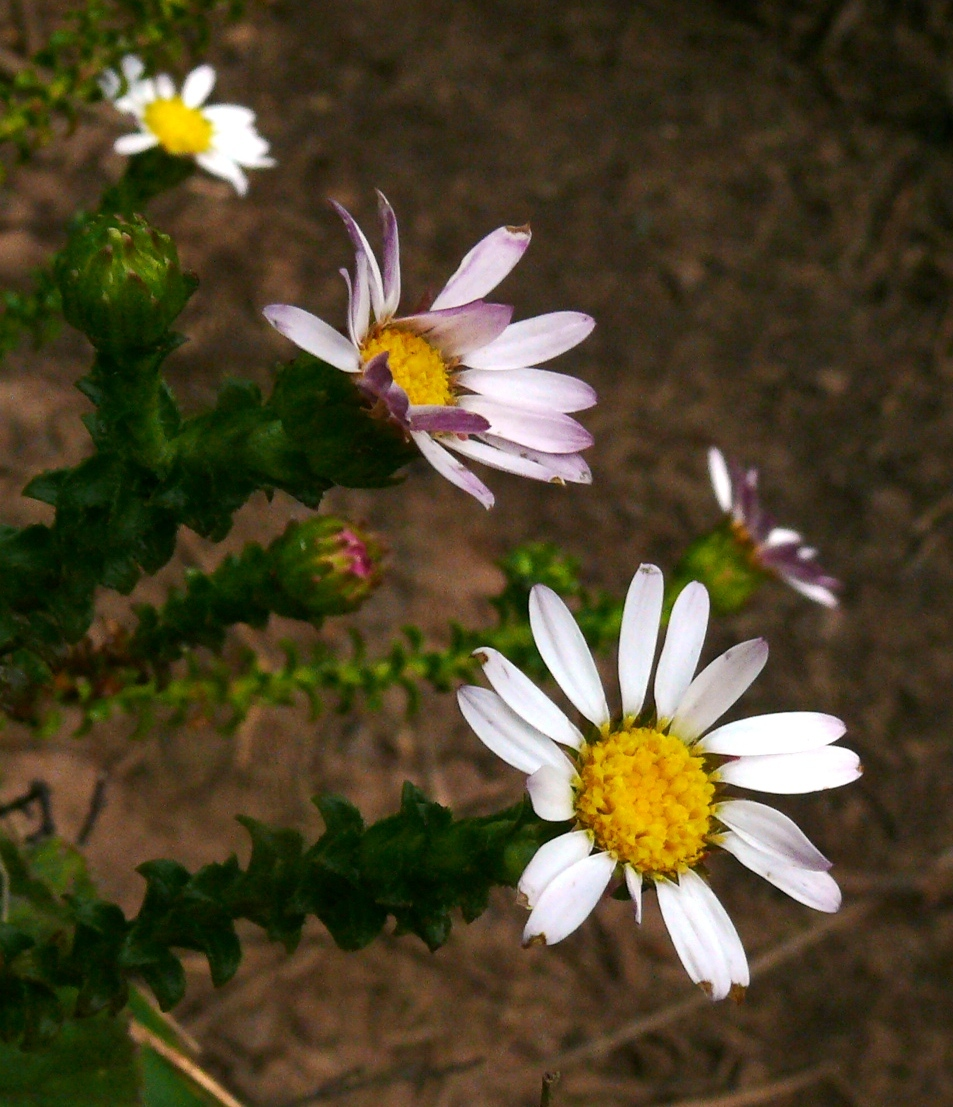
P. reflexa

=== Differences between the species ===
Polyarrhena stricta is an ascending or erect low shrublet of about 30 cm (12 in) high with the outer whorl of involucral bracts hairless in the lower third or with some stiff hairs, narrowly ovate or lancet-shaped ascending leaves. P. reflexa subsp. reflexa is an ascending or erect high shrublet of about 1 m (3.3 ft) high with the outer whorl of involucral bracts hairless in the lower third or with some stiff hairs, broadly ovate reflexed leaves of 5–10 mm (0.20–0.39 in) long. P. reflexa subsp. brachyphylla is an ascending or erect high shrublet of about 1 m (3.3 ft) high with the outer whorl of involucral bracts entirely hairless, broadly ovate reflexed leaves of up to 4 mm (0.16 in) long. Polyarrhena imbricata is an ascending or erect low shrublet of about 15 cm (5.9 in) high with the outer whorl of involucral bracts over the entire surface consistently hairy, the leaves pressed to the stem, overlapping and the heads sit on up to 6 cm (2.4 in) long leafless peduncles. P. prostrata subsp. prostrata is a creeping, copiously branching shrublet with branches up to 40 cm (16 in) long with the outer whorl of involucral bracts over the entire surface consistently hairy, the densely hairy, ovate leaves with entire margins, at right angles to the branches or even somewhat reflexed. P. prostrata subsp. dentata is also a creeping, copiously branching shrublet with branches up to 40 cm (16 in) long with the outer whorl of involucral bracts over the entire surface consistently hairy, and also the roughly hairy leaves at right angles to the branches or even somewhat reflexed, but these are narrow ovate to lancet-shaped, tend to lose these on the surface and have a margins with teeth.

=== Convergent evolution ===
The species of Polyarrhena have a strong likeness to those of Felicia section Anhebecarpaea, in particular P. reflexa to F. echinata, P. imbricata to F. nordenstamii and P. stricta to F. westae.

== Conservation ==
For two taxa, Polyarrhena imbricata and P. reflexa subsp. reflexa the continued survival is considered to be of least concern. Both subspecies of P. prostrata are considered rare. P. reflexa subsp. brachyphylla is thought to be a vulnerable species. For P. stricta, insufficient data are available to assess its conservation status.
