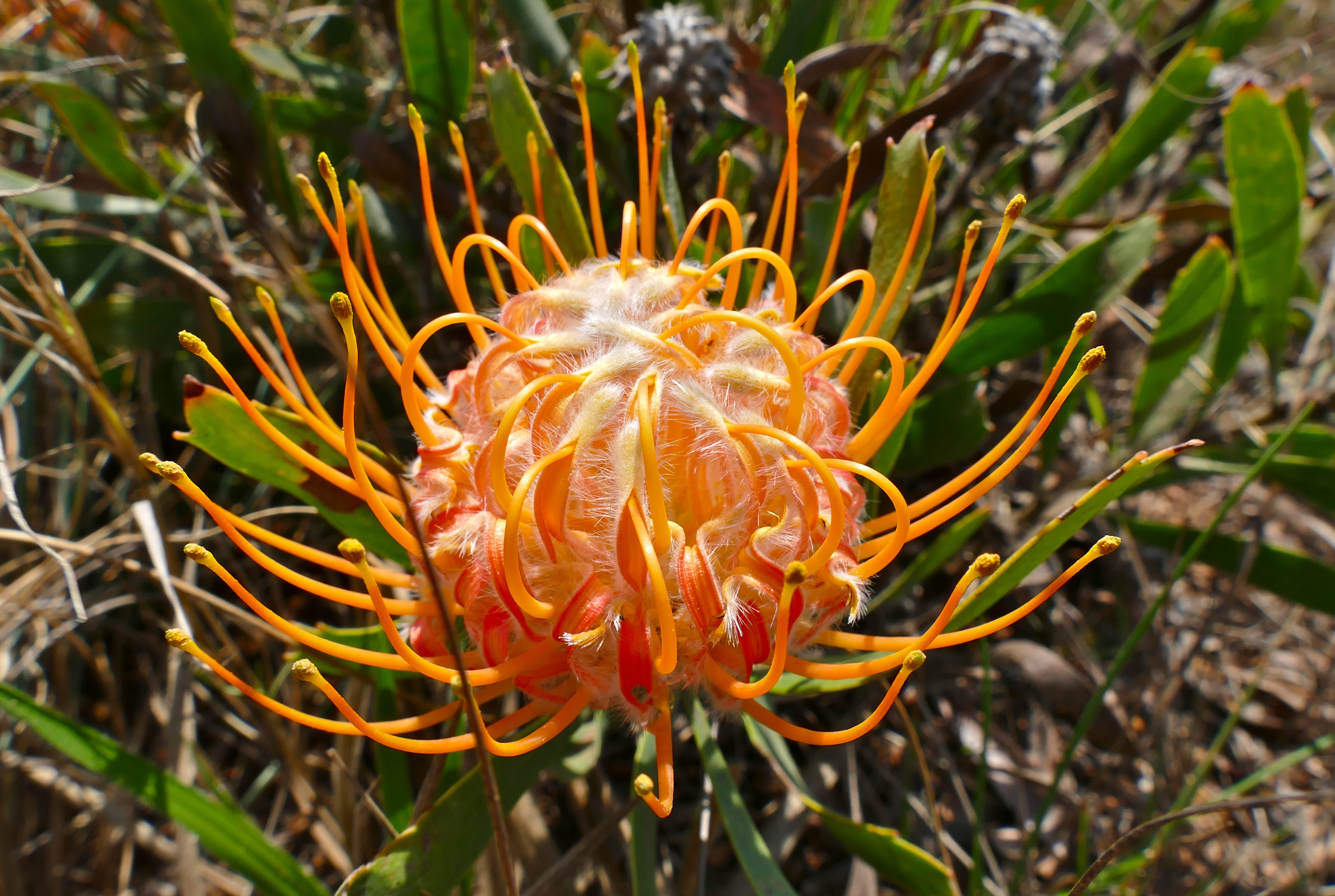

Conservation status
- Endangered (IUCN 3.1)

Scientific classification
- Kingdom: Plantae
- Clade: Embryophytes
- Clade: Tracheophytes
- Clade: Angiosperms
- Clade: Eudicots
- Order: Proteales
- Family: Proteaceae
- Genus: Leucospermum
- Species: L. gerrardii

Binomial name
- Leucospermum gerrardii Stapf, 1912

= Leucospermum gerrardii =

Species of plant native to South Africa

Leucospermum gerrardii is an evergreen, mat-forming shrub of mostly about 30 cm (12 in) high and up to 1 m (3.3 ft) in diameter, with branches originating from an underground rootstock. It has narrow leaves, sometimes with three or four teeth near the tip, and prominent, raised, netted to parallel veins. The flower heads are egg-shaped about 5 cm (2 in) in diameter and consist of at first yellow, later orange or scarlet perianths, and long styles reaching far beyond the perianth and together giving the impression of a pincushion. It is assigned to the family Proteaceae. It can be found in South Africa (KwaZulu-Natal, Mpumalanga) and Eswatini. It mostly flowers between September and November. The species is called dwarf pincushion or soapstone pincushion in English.

== Description ==
Leucospermum gerrardii is a 20–40 cm (7.9–15.7 in) high, evergreen, mat-forming shrub of up to 1 m (3.3 ft) in diameter, with upright branches originating from an underground rootstock. These generally form a closed cover of equal height, so the result is somewhat reminiscent of a cushion. The stems that carry the flower heads are slender, upright, 2–3 mm (0.079–0.118 in) thick, initially covered in spiderweb-like hairs, which get lost with age. The leaves linear to inverted lance-shaped, sometimes curved sideways like a sabre, 5–9 cm (2.0–3.5 in) long and ¾–2 cm (0.3–0.8 in) wide, at the foot gradually narrowing into a distinct leaf stalk. The leaves usually have an entire margin and end in a bony tip, but sometimes have three or four teeth with a bony tip. They initially have some fine and soft hair on their surface, but this soon wears off. The leaves also have a prominent pattern of raised, netted to parallel veins.

The flower heads are egg-shaped 4–7 cm (1.6–2.8 in) in diameter atop a 1–2 cm (0.39–0.79 in) long stalk, sit mostly individually, but sometimes with two or three together near the end of the branches. The communal base of the flowers in the same head has is cylinder-shaped 1½–2½ cm (0.6–1.0 in) long and 3–4 mm (0.12–0.16 in) in diameter. It is covered underneath by oval bracts with a pointy tip of about 1 cm (0.4 in) long and half as wide, very densely covered in soft hairs, rubbery in consistency and set in two or three whorls. The bracts that subtend the individual flowers are narrower oval with a pointy tip, are about 1 cm long and 3 mm (0.12 in) wide, rubbery in consistency and embracing the flower at its foot. It is thickly woolly at its base and ends in a tuft of long straight hairs at its tip. The perianth is 3–3½ cm (1.2–1.4 in) long, initially yellow but later coloring orange to scarlet. The lower part of the tetramerous perianth is fused into a tube, the middle part that consist of the claws is ruptured by the style at anthesis, the parts coiling, the lobe facing the center of the flower head with fine very short, powdery hairs, the other lobes are thickly set with felty hairy. The upper part of the periant (or limbs) are lance-shaped and pointy at the tip, about ½ cm (0.2 in) long, have a dense growth of long straight hairs. The lance-shaped, pointy anthers are directly attached to the upper part of the perianth, are about 3 mm (0.12 in) long and lack a filament. The style that is about 5 cm (2 in) long, tapers towards the tip and slightly curves towards the center of the flower head. It is topped by a slight thickening called pollen presenter, which has a slender cone-shape with a pointy tip, is 2–2½ mm (0.08–0.1 in) long, with a groove at the very end that acts as the stigma. The ovary is subtended by four nectar producing awl-shaped scales of about 2 mm (0.08 in) long. It mostly flowers between September and December.

The subtribe Proteinae, to which the genus Leucospermum has been assigned, consistently has a basic chromosome number of twelve (2n=24).

== Differences with related species ==
The dwarf pincushion differs from its nearest relatives (L. cuneiforme, L. innovans and L. saxosum) and other species with cylinder-shaped receptacles (common base of the flowers in one head) by growing in low cushion-like clusters, by the linear to inverted lance-shaped leaves that slightly curve sideways (like a sabre), and by having raised veins.

== Taxonomy ==
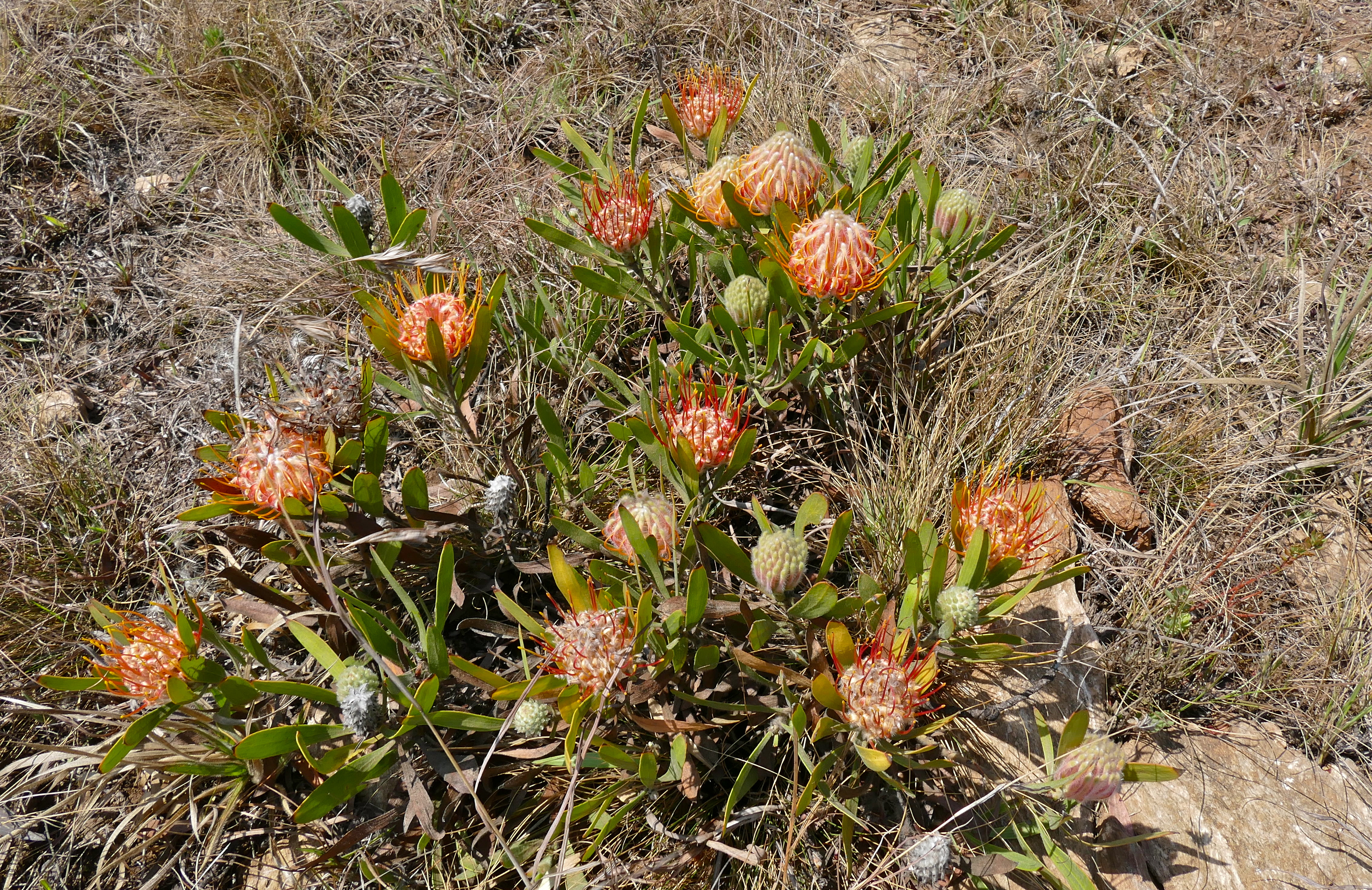
Habit

Otto Stapf described the dwarf pincushion in 1912, and named it in honor of William Tyrer Gerrard, who had collected the first specimens known to science probably in 1865. Although plants from central KwaZulu-Natal overall have broader leaves than those from Mpumalange, a continuous grade between the extremes exists, and no subtaxa have been proposed. L. gerrardii has been assigned to the section Crassicaudex.

== Distribution, habitat and ecology ==
The dwarf pincushion mainly occurs in grassveld among granite and quartzite outcrops in the higher mountain areas at 1200–1800 m (4,000–6,000 ft) in the Makhonjwa Mountains near Barberton and the northwest of Eswatini. A few small and isolated populations can be found on grassland on Table Mountain Sandstone and Ecca Sandstone in central Natal at 450–1100 m (1,500–3,500 ft) altitude. It is often associated with serpentine in the underground. Annual rainfall may be as much as 1000 mm (40 in) or 1500 mm (60 in) at the greater altitudes, mainly falling during the summer. The flowers are mainly pollinated by birds. The seeds are released from the heads about two months after flowering and are collected by ants that bring them to their underground nests. L. gerrardii plants survive the regular grass fires that kill the above-ground branches, because it regenerates from the many spreading, underground stems.

== Conservation ==
L. gerrardii is considered near threatened, due to a reduction of the population by about 30% over the last hundred years that was caused by afforestation, overgrazing, too high-frequency burning and habitat fragmentation.
