= Joseph Mathews =

Joseph Mathews may refer to:

- Joseph William Mathews, English horticulturist and gardener
- Joseph Howard Mathews, American physical chemist
- Joseph Mathews, fictional R&AW agent portrayed by Diganta Hazarika in the 2023 film Pathaan

== See also ==
- Joseph Matthews (disambiguation)
- Joe Matthews (disambiguation)
