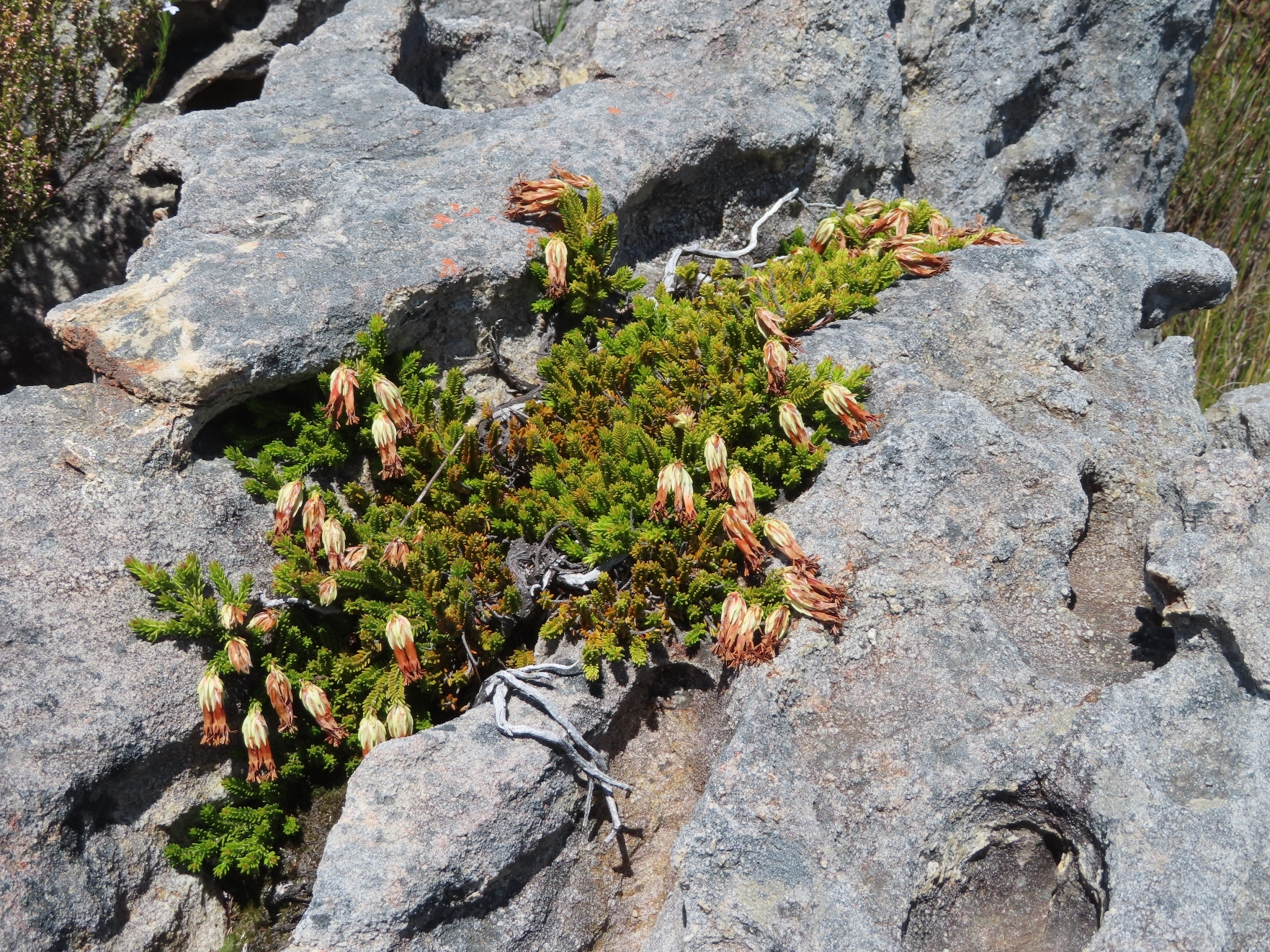

Scientific classification
- Kingdom: Plantae
- Clade: Tracheophytes
- Clade: Angiosperms
- Clade: Eudicots
- Clade: Asterids
- Order: Ericales
- Family: Ericaceae
- Genus: Erica
- Species: E. banksia

Binomial name
- Erica banksia Andrews

Synonyms
- Ectasis banksia (Andrews) D.Don; Ericoides banksia (Andrews) Kuntze

= Erica banksia =

Species of flowering plant

Erica banksia, also known as Erica banksii, is a plant belonging to the genus Erica and forming part of the fynbos. The species is endemic to the Western Cape.

The plant also has three subspecies:

- Erica banksia subsp. banksia
- Erica banksia subsp. comptonii (T.M.Salter) E.G.H.Oliv. & I.M.Oliv.
- Erica banksia subsp. purpurea (Andrews) E.G.H.Oliv. & I.M.Oliv.
