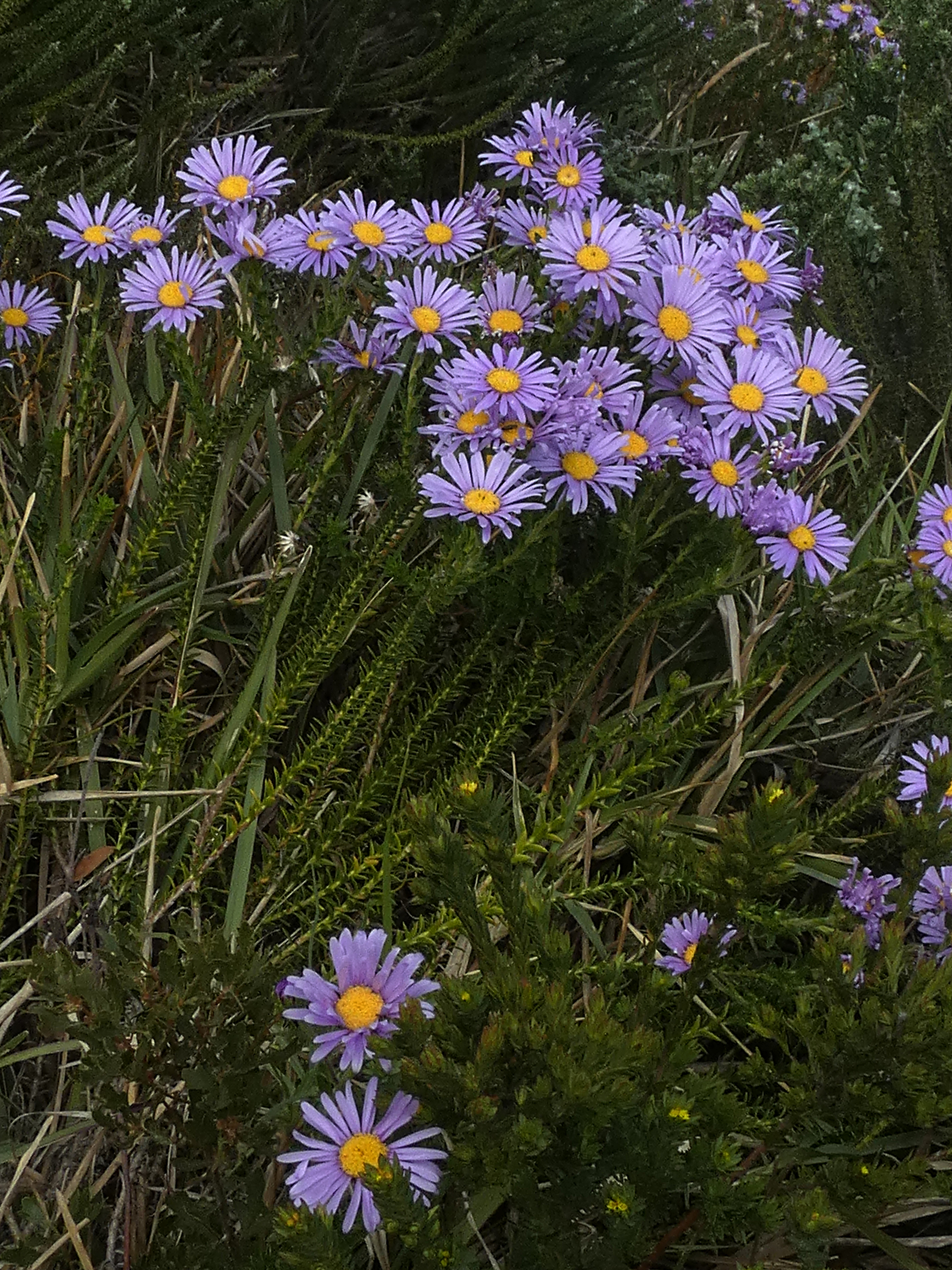

Scientific classification
- Kingdom: Plantae
- Clade: Tracheophytes
- Clade: Angiosperms
- Clade: Eudicots
- Clade: Asterids
- Order: Asterales
- Family: Asteraceae
- Genus: Felicia
- Section: Felicia sect. Anhebecarpaea
- Species: F. echinata

Binomial name
- Felicia echinata (Thunb.) Nees

Synonyms
- Pteronia echinata, Aster echinata; F. paralia, F. echinata var. paralia

= Felicia echinata =

Shrublet in the daisy family from South Africa

Felicia echinata, commonly known as the dune daisy or prickly felicia, is a species of shrub native to South Africa belonging to the daisy family (Compositae or Asteraceae). It grows to 1 m (3.3 ft) high and bears blue-purple flower heads with yellow central discs. In the wild, it flowers April to October.

== Description ==
Felicia echinata is an upright, strongly branching shrublet of up to 1 m (3.3 ft) high. The well-branching stems are alternately and often densely set with thick, inclined, overlapping leaves of 10–14 mm (0.39–0.55 in) long and 3–5 mm (0.12–0.20 in) wide, hairless or fringed. and also on the upper leaf surface with hairs and, below the upper leaf surface, with many roundish glands. As in almost all Asteraceae, the individual florets are 5-merous, small, and clustered in typical "composite" heads, surrounded by an involucre of three or four whorls of lanceolate bracts, the outer 4 mm (0.16 in) long and 1 mm (0.039 in) wide, the inner 9 mm (0.35 in) long and 1.2 mm (0.047 in) wide, all with rough hairs that become glandular near the bract tip. In Felicia echinata, the centre of the head contains many yellow disc florets of 3–4 mm (0.12–0.16 in) long, and is surrounded by one single whorl of about 25 bluish-purple, rarely white, ligulate florets 13 mm (0.51 in) long and 1.8 mm (0.071 in) wide, which are hairy at their base. These florets sit on a common base (or receptacle) 15 mm (0.59 in) across and are not individually subtended by a bract. The one-seeded fruits (or cypselas) are inverted, egg-shaped to oval, yellow-brown to reddish in color, have two conspicuous vascular bundles along their edge, and are crowned by a circle of many, 4 mm (0.16 in)-long, bone-colored hairs, with small teeth along their length and slightly wider at the tip. The surface of those belonging to the ligulate florets are hairless, those of the disc florets have very short hairs. Solitary flower heads sit at the tip of a 0–4 cm (0.0–1.6 in) long peduncles, in few-headed, umbel-like inflorescences. The species is diploid, with a base chromosome number of 9 (2n=18). It is found on sand dunes and along road verges.

The flowers appear in the Southern Hemisphere spring, from August to October.

=== Differences with other species ===
F. echinata has much in common with the other two species of the section Anhebecarpaea (F. westae and F. nordenstamii), which all have more than two whorls of involucral bracts, white ligulate florets with a purplish wash on the rear, pappus hairs of equal length and the surface of the cypselas of the ligulate florets bold, while the surface of the cypselas of the disc florets is covered in short bristly hairs. F. westae however has narrow lancet-shaped leaves of at most 1½ cm (0.6 in) wide that are inclined upwards and pressed against the stem, while in F. echinata the leaves are narrowly egg-shaped, about 3 cm (1¼ in) wide and curved outward from the stem. F. nordenstamii has 14 mm (0.55 in) long involucral bracts with dense long hairs, while F. echinata has 1 cm long involucral bracts with stiff bristly hairs, later becoming bold. Polyarrhena reflexa has a strong likeness to Felicia echinata, but has bisexual ligulate florets, that are white, and have a pink wash on the outer surface, and male disc florets, while in F. echinata ligulate florets are female and blue-purple in color and the disc florets are bisexual.

== Taxonomy ==
The species was first described by Swedish naturalist Carl Peter Thunberg in his 1800 work Prodromus Plantarum Capensium as Pteronia echinata. The species name is the Latin word echinata "prickly". In 1832, Christian Friedrich Lessing assigned it to the genus Aster, creating the new combination Aster echinata. One year later (1833), Nees von Esenbeck made the combination we now use: Felicia echinata. A slightly different, hairless plant was described by Augustin Pyramus de Candolle in 1836, who named it Felicia paralia, but in 1865, the Irish botanist William Henry Harvey reduced this taxon to F. echinata var. paralia. In 1973, Jürke Grau established that there is a continuous range in hairiness, and so considered F. paralia synonymous with Felicia echinata.

Felicia echinata is the type of the section Anhebecarpaea, and is the closest relative of F. westae and F. nordenstamii.

== Distribution and habitat ==
An endemic of the Cape Floristic Region, F. echinata only occurs in a narrow strip along the south coast between Mossel Bay and Bathurst.

== Ecology ==
The plants are able to set seed after 1½ years. The seeds are produced between August and October and are dispersed by wind.

== Cultivation ==
Felicia echinata adapts readily to cultivation, requiring well-drained soil and a sunny position. It has horticultural potential as a rockery plant.

== Conservation ==
Felicia echinata is considered a species of least concern with a stable population.
