= Erica cygnea =

Scientific classification
- Kingdom: Plantae
- Clade: Tracheophytes
- Clade: Angiosperms
- Clade: Eudicots
- Clade: Asterids
- Order: Ericales
- Family: Ericaceae
- Genus: Erica
- Species: E. cygnea

Binomial name
- Erica cygnea T.M.Salter

Species of flowering plant

Erica cygnea is a plant belonging to the genus Erica and forming part of the fynbos. The species is endemic to the Western Cape and occurs on Platberg in the Kogelberg Nature Reserve. The area of occurrence is 10 km² which confirms the plan's status as rare.
