= Erica galpinii =

Scientific classification
- Kingdom: Plantae
- Clade: Tracheophytes
- Clade: Angiosperms
- Clade: Eudicots
- Clade: Asterids
- Order: Ericales
- Family: Ericaceae
- Genus: Erica
- Species: E. galpinii

Binomial name
- Erica galpinii T.M.Salter, (1935)

Species of flowering plant

Erica galpinii is a plant belonging to the genus Erica and forming part of the fynbos. The species is endemic to the Western Cape and occurs in the Kleinrivier Mountains near Hermanus.

This endangered and rare species consists of only 450 plant specimens that occur in two subpopulations in an area of 4 km2. One of the two populations has declined by 50% in the past two generations, mainly due to excessive veld fires.
