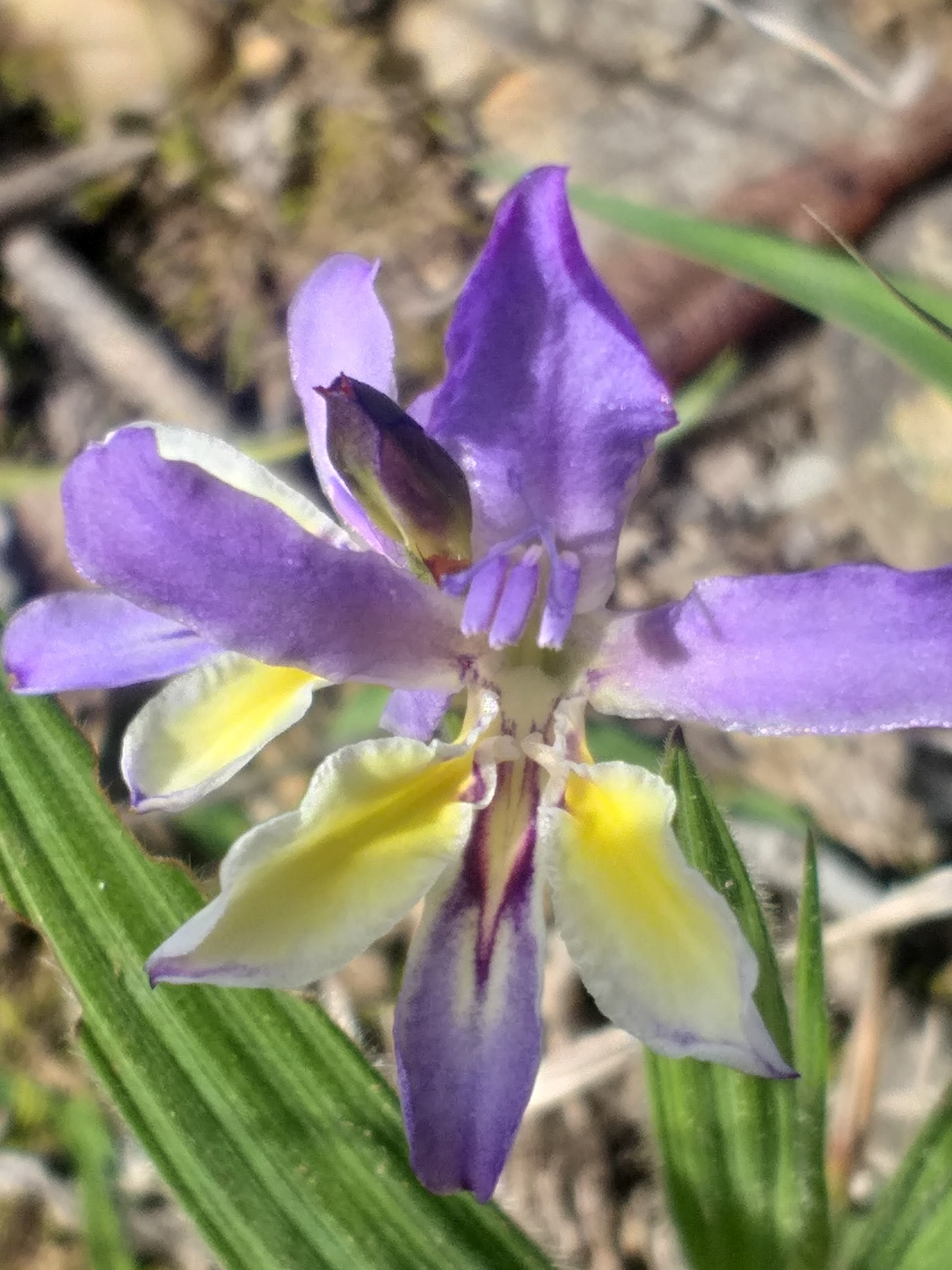

Scientific classification
- Kingdom: Plantae
- Clade: Tracheophytes
- Clade: Angiosperms
- Clade: Monocots
- Order: Asparagales
- Family: Iridaceae
- Genus: Babiana
- Species: B. fourcadei

Binomial name
- Babiana fourcadei G.J.Lewis

= Babiana fourcadei =

Species of flowering plant

Babiana fourcadei is a perennial flowering plant and geophyte belonging to the genus Babiana. The species is endemic to the Eastern Cape and the Western Cape. The species is named after Henry Georges Fourcade.
