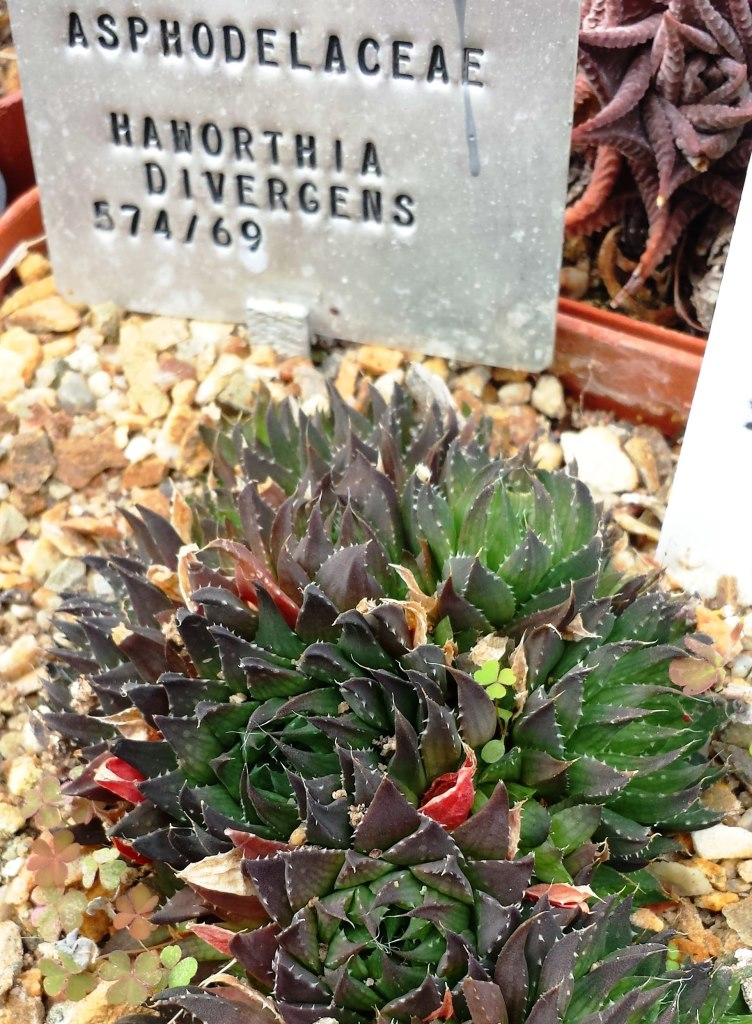

Scientific classification
- Kingdom: Plantae
- Clade: Tracheophytes
- Clade: Angiosperms
- Clade: Monocots
- Order: Asparagales
- Family: Asphodelaceae
- Subfamily: Asphodeloideae
- Genus: Haworthia
- Species: H. monticola

Binomial name
- Haworthia monticola Fourcade

Synonyms
- Haworthia chloracantha var. monticola (Fourc.) Halda

= Haworthia monticola =

Species of succulent

Haworthia monticola is a perennial succulent belonging to the genus Haworthia. The species is endemic to the Western Cape and is part of the fynbos. It occurs from Oudtshoorn to Uniondale.

== Varieties ==
There are two varieties of Haworthia monticola:

- Haworthia monticola var. asema M.B.Bayer
- Haworthia monticola var. monticola
