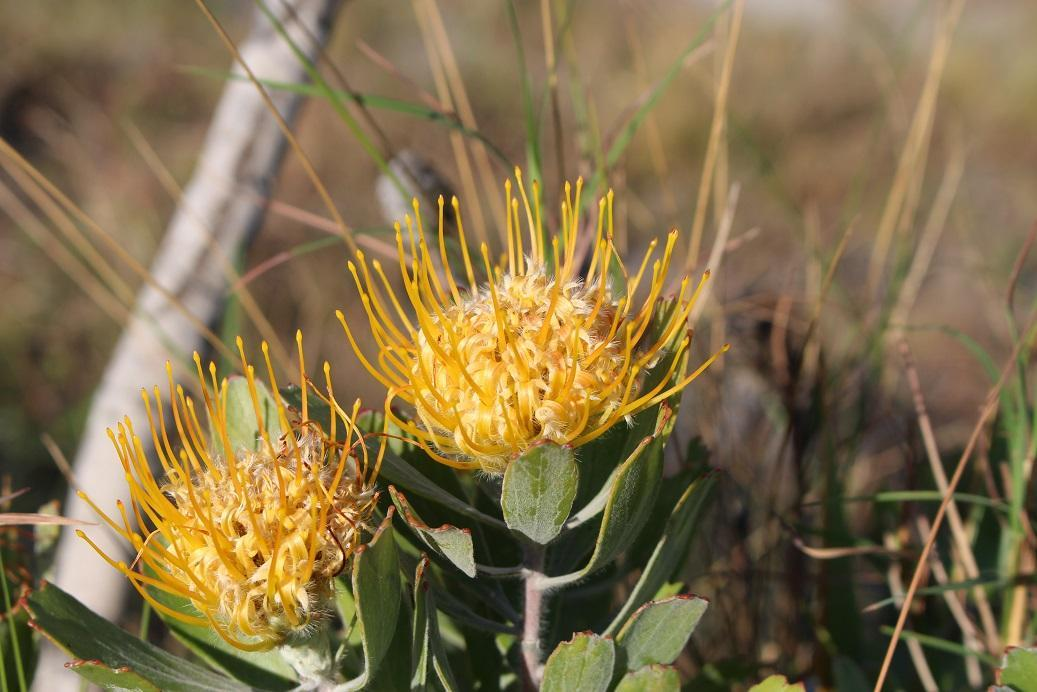

Conservation status
- Endangered (IUCN 3.1)

Scientific classification
- Kingdom: Plantae
- Clade: Embryophytes
- Clade: Tracheophytes
- Clade: Angiosperms
- Clade: Eudicots
- Order: Proteales
- Family: Proteaceae
- Genus: Leucospermum
- Species: L. innovans

Binomial name
- Leucospermum innovans Rourke

= Leucospermum innovans =

Species of plant native to South Africa

Leucospermum innovans is an upright evergreen shrub with many pustules growing on the lower branches, wedge-shaped leaves, and oval, flower heads that are yellow on the outside, but with scarlet stripes on the inside of the perianth claws, with long styles sticking far beyond the perianths, jointly giving the impression of a pincushion. It is called Pondoland pincushion or Transkei pincushion in English. Flowers occur on and off between July and December, but flowering peaks in September and October.

== Description ==
Leucospermum innovans Is an evergreen upright, rounded shrub of up to 1 m (3.3 ft) in diameter. The main stems grow from a woody rootstock of up to 30 cm (0.98 ft) thick. The flowering branches are very straight, upright and slender, ½ cm (0.2 in) thick, with a felty appearance due to fine crisped hairs, interspersed with many 3–4 mm (0.12–0.16 in) long straight hairs. The leaves are inverted egg-shaped to wedge-shaped or very broadly wedge-shaped, 7–10 cm (2.8–3.9 in) long and 3–5 cm (1.2–2.0 in) broad, narrowing at the foot Into a stalk, the tip rounded or blunt often deeply incised and ending in five to ten bony teeth, hairless, but felty near the stalk.

The flower heads are globe-shaped, 8–9 cm (3.1–3.5 in) across, seated or with a stalk of up to 1½ cm (0.6 in) long. The common base of the flowers in the same head is cylinder-shaped, about 3 cm (1.2 in) long and 1 cm (0.39 in) wide. The bracts subtending the head are broadly oval with a pointy tip 1 cm long and 8 mm wide, cartilaginous in consistency, the outer surface densely felty, and distinctly grey near the tip.

The bracts subtending the individual flower is oval with a pointy tip, envelopping the flower at the foot, very densely woolly near the base and felty higher up, softly cartilaginous in consistency and about 7 mm (0.28 in) long and 5 mm (0.20 in) wide. The lower part of the perianth called tube, that remains merged when the flower is open, is about 10–12 mm (0.39–0.47 in) long, somewhat compressed sideways, narrow near the foot at 2 mm (0.079 in) and bulging higher up with a width of about ½ cm (0.2 in), hairless at its foot and slightly felty higher up. The middle part (or claws) is densely felty and also has 3–5 mm (0.12–0.20 in) straight long hairs on the outer surface, all strongly curled back after the flower opens. The upper part (or limbs), which enclosed the pollen presenter in the bud, are very narrowly ellipse-shaped, each about 5 mm long and 1½ mm wide, felty with in addition long straight hairs. The limb facing the edge of the head is less densely felty than the other three. From the centre of the perianth emerges a slender tapering, style of about 5 cm (2.0 in) long, slightly arching toward the centre of the head. The thickened part at the tip of the style called pollen presenter is narrowly cone-shaped with a pointy tip, about 2 mm (0.079 in) long and 1 mm wide long, with the groove that functions as the stigma across the very tip.

=== Differences with related species ===
L. innovans differs from its close relative L. cuneiforme because it has very broadly wedge-shaped to inverted egg-shaped leaves, 3–5 cm (1.2–2.0 in) wide, deeply incised with five to ten teeth near the tip, and the lower, merged part of the perianth, called tube, is somewhat compressed sideways, narrow near the foot but somewhat bulging higher up. L. cuneiforme on the other hand has narrow to broadly wedge-shaped leaves 0.6–3 cm wide, with three to ten teeth, and the perianth tube cylinder-shaped and slightly compressed sideways.

== Taxonomy ==
As far as known, the Pondoland pincushion was first collected for science by a Mr. William Tyson in October 1885. This and later collected plants that are now considered to belong to the Pondoland pincushion were initially identified as L. attenuatum R.Br. (now Leucospermum cuneiforme). In 1970, John Patrick Rourke decided the differences with L. cuneiforme are consistent, and he described it as a new species, calling it Leucospermum innovans.

Leucospermum innovans is assigned to the cylindric pincushions, section Crassicaudex.

The species name innovans is Latin and means "novelty".

== Distribution, habitat and ecology ==
L. innovans can only be found in the subtropical coastal belt between Lusikisiki (Eastern Cape province) and Port Shepstone (in KwaZulu-Natal), where it grows mostly within about 3 km (1.9 mi) from the sea. The Pondoland pincushion appears in a vegetation type called Pondoland Coastal Plateau Sourveld, always on or near outcrops of Table Mountain Sandstone. Here, the annual precipitation is fairly high at 1,150–1,250 mm (45–49 in), mostly during the summer.

The species is a very resistant to fire, and new shoots appear quickly from the underground rootstock after the above grond parts have been burnt off. Because fires occur with intervals of only a few years, the plants mostly remain lower than 45 cm (1 1/2 ft), but if protected may reach 1 m (3.3 ft).

The Pondoland pincushion is pollinated by birds. The fruits are ripe about two months after flowering and fall to the ground. Here, these are collected by ants who carry them to their underground nests.

== Conservation ==
The Pondoland pincushion is considered an endangered species due to a very fragmented and small area of 29 km^{2} (11 sq mi), and a continuing decline caused by extending agriculture, afforestation and too high frequency fires.
