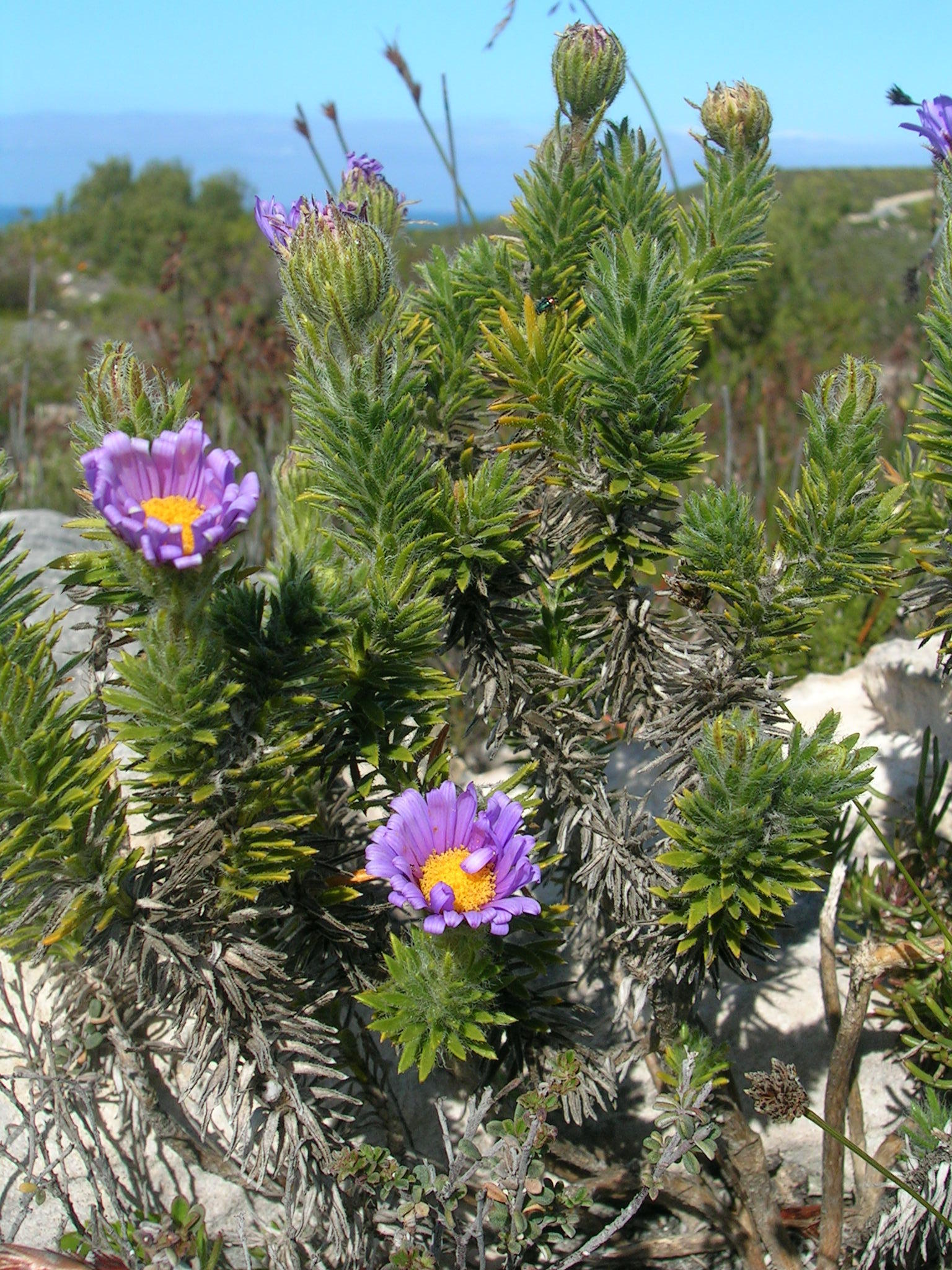

Scientific classification
- Kingdom: Plantae
- Clade: Tracheophytes
- Clade: Angiosperms
- Clade: Eudicots
- Clade: Asterids
- Order: Asterales
- Family: Asteraceae
- Genus: Felicia
- Section: Felicia sect. Anhebecarpaea
- Species: F. nordenstamii

Binomial name
- Felicia nordenstamii Grau

= Felicia nordenstamii =

Shrublet in the daisy family from South Africa

Felicia nordenstamii is a flowering shrub in the family Asteraceae. It is found only in South Africa where it grows on limestone hills close to the sea on the southern coast. Felicia nordenstamii is a many-branched shrub growing up to 30 cm (1 ft) tall. The lower parts of the stems are covered in grayish brown bark and the upper stem has many crowded, upwardly angled, alternate leaves with long hairs on the lower surfaces. Large flower heads form at the tips of the branches, each about 4 1/2 cm (1 3/4 in) across, with about thirty purplish blue ray florets surrounding many yellow disc florets.

== Description ==
Felicia nordenstamii is a branched shrub of up to 30 cm (1 ft) high, that is relatively strongly woody at its base. Where it has lost its leaves in lower part of the stem, it is covered with grayish brown bark. In the leaf-covered younger parts, the stem carries long hairs. The leaves are set alternately along the stem, densely crowded, at an upward angle, without a stalk, narrowly inverted egg-shaped, about 11 mm (0.43 in) long and 3 mm (0.12 in) wide, with an entire margin that is somewhat curved upwards, the lower surface with long hairs, and the upper surface hairless.

The large flower heads are set individually at the end of flower stalks of up to 1 cm (0.4 in) long, covered in dense long woolly hair. Surrounding each flower head are three to four rows of unruly arranged bracts (or phyllaries) that together form the so-called involucre, which is up to 15 mm (0.59 in) in diameter. These bracts are lance-shaped, about 2 mm (0.079 in) wide, and of varying length. The outer bracts are long-haired, about 14 mm (0.55 in) long, the inner eventually hairless, about 7 mm (0.28 in) long. Approximately thirty female ray florets, have purplish blue straps of about 15 mm (0.6 in) long and 2 mm (0.08 in) wide, and are hairy in the upper part of the tubular section at its base. These surround numerous bisexual disc florets with a yellow corolla of about 6 mm (0.24 in) long, hairy in the middle part. In the center of each corolla are five anthers merged into a tube, through which the style grows when the floret opens, hoovering up the pollen on its shaft. At the tip of both style branches is a narrowly triangular appendage. Surrounding the base of the corolla are many, yellowish white, serrated, more or less deciduous pappus bristles, all about equal in length at 6 mm (0.24 in). The eventually yellowish brown to reddish, dry, one-seeded, indehiscent fruits called cypselae are elliptic in outline, about 3.5 mm (0.14 in) long and 2 mm (0.079 in) wide, with a ridge along the margin. The cypselae of the ray florets are hairless, those of the disc florets short-haired.

Flowering occurs from September to October.

=== Differences with related species ===
Like Felicia echinata and F. westae, together with which F. nordenstamii constitutes the section Anhebecarpaea, it has firm, very regularly and densely set leaves on the younger parts of the stems, distinguishing them from all other Felicia species. The dense, long and woolly hairs, the long inner involucral bracts, and the narrowly obovate leaves set at an upward angle, set it apart from F. echinata (recurved narrowly ovate leaves) and F. westae (line- to lance-shaped leaves, pressed against the stem, hairless except for a fringe). It also has a likeness to Polyarrhena imbricata, which lacks the woolly hairs, large involucral bracts, and has white ray florets, tinged purple on the underside.

== Taxonomy ==
As far as known, Felicia nordenstamii was first collected just east of Cape Agulhas by Terence Macleane Salter in 1934. It was recognized as a distinct species by Jürke Grau in his 1973 Revision of the genus Felicia (Asteraceae). The species is considered to be part of the section Anhebecarpaea.

The species was named in honor of Rune Bertil Nordenstam, a Swedish botanist that collected two specimens of this plant in 1962.

== Distribution, habitat and ecology ==
Felicia nordenstamii is only known from limestone ridges just east of Cape Agulhas and near the Potberg.

== Conservation ==
Felicia nordenstamii is considered near threatened. It grows only at about fifteen locations spread over and area of about 1,000 km^{2} (390 sq mi). A substantial part of its habitat was lost over due to urban expansion around Struisbaai. It grows on several limestone ridges that have been identified for development. Its habitat is also degraded over its entire range because of invasive Acacia species.
