= Joseph Matthews =

Joseph Matthews may refer to:

- Joseph W. Matthews (1812–1862), American politician who served as Governor of Mississippi
- J. B. Matthews (1894–1966), Methodist churchman, chief investigator for the Martin Dies, Jr. House Committee on Un-American Activities
- Joseph Matthews (Medal of Honor) (1849–1912), U.S. Navy sailor and Medal of Honor recipient

== See also ==
- Joe Matthews (disambiguation)
- Joseph Mathews (disambiguation)
