= Disa salteri =

Scientific classification
- Kingdom: Plantae
- Clade: Tracheophytes
- Clade: Angiosperms
- Clade: Monocots
- Order: Asparagales
- Family: Orchidaceae
- Subfamily: Orchidoideae
- Genus: Disa
- Species: D. salteri

Binomial name
- Disa salteri G.J.Lewis

Synonyms
- Amphigena salteri (G.J.Lewis) Szlach.

Species of flowering plant

Disa salteri is a perennial plant and geophyte belonging to the genus Disa and is part of the fynbos. The plant is endemic to the Northern Cape and Western Cape. It is named after the botanist Terence Macleane Salter.
