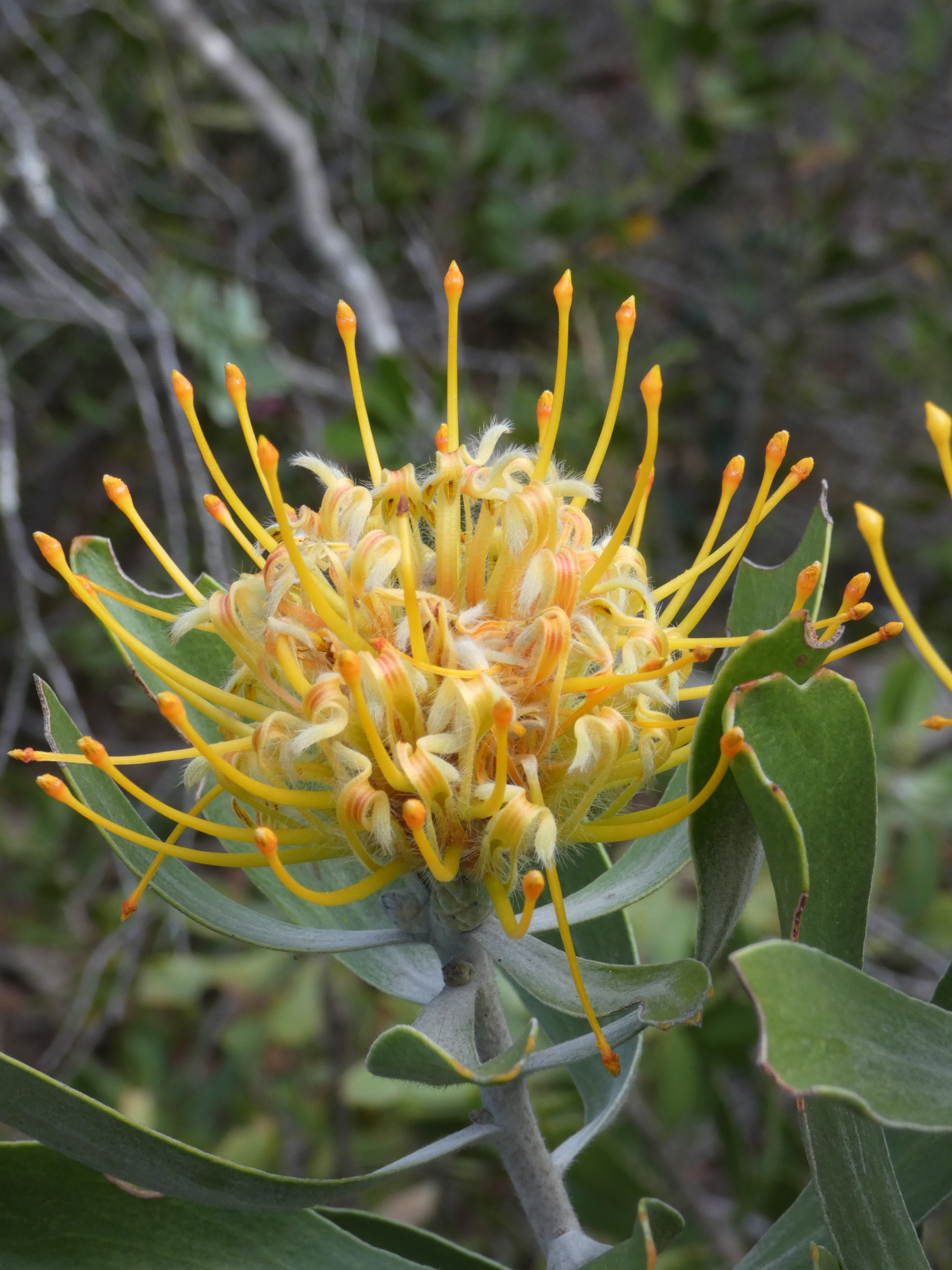

Conservation status
- Least Concern (IUCN 3.1)

Scientific classification
- Kingdom: Plantae
- Clade: Embryophytes
- Clade: Tracheophytes
- Clade: Angiosperms
- Clade: Eudicots
- Order: Proteales
- Family: Proteaceae
- Genus: Leucospermum
- Species: L. cuneiforme

Binomial name
- Leucospermum cuneiforme (Burm.f.) Rourke

Synonyms
- Leucadendron cuneiforme; Protea elliptica, Leucadendrum ellipticum, Leucospermum ellipticum, Leucadendron ellipticum; Leucadendrum phyllanthifolium, Leucospermum phyllanthifolium; Leucadendrum cervinum; Leucospermum attenuatum, P. attenuata; Leucospermum zeyheri; Leucospermum septemdentatum

= Leucospermum cuneiforme =

Species of plant native to South Africa

Leucospermum cuneiforme is an upright evergreen shrub with many pustules growing on the lower branches, wedge-shaped leaves, and oval, initially yellow flower heads that later turn orange, with long styles sticking far beyond the perianths, jointly giving the impression of a pincushion. It is called wart-stemmed pincushion in English and luisiesbos (lice-bush) in Afrikaans. The species is common in the southern mountains of South Africa.

== Description ==
Leucospermum cuneiforme is an upright, evergreen shrub, often of only ½–1 m (1½–3 ft) high, that has branches that originate from a woody rootstock in the ground, and if protected against fire will develop a main stem and grows up to 3 m (9.8 ft) high. The stem and lower branches are covered in pustules, a unique feature for this species. The upright flowering branches are 3–7 mm (0.12–0.28 in) in diameter and appear to be grey due to soft, crinkly hairs. The leaves are hairless, narrow to broadly wedge-shaped 4½–11 cm (1.8–4.4 in) long and 0.6–3 cm (0.24–1.18 in) wide, with three to ten teeth with bony tips near the far end of the leaf.

The flower heads sitting usually solitary or grouped with two or three near the end of the branches, are egg-shaped, 5–9 cm (2.0–3.5 in) in diameter each on a stalk of up to 1½ cm (0.6 in) long. The common base of the flowers within the same head is cylindric with a blunt tip, 2½–4½ cm (1.0–1.8 in) long and 6 mm (0.24 in) wide. The bracts that subtend the flower head are broadly oval with a pointy tip, about 0.8–1.0 cm (0.31–0.39 in) long and 6 mm (0.24 in) wide, closely overlapping, rubbery in consistency, grey due to the dense soft hair. The bracts that subtend the individual flower are oval with a pointy tip, 1.0–1.2 cm (0.39–0.47 in) long and about 7 mm (0.28 in) wide, rubbery in consistency, embracing the foot of the perianth, densely woolly at the base, less dense nearer the tip and with a dense row of hairs around the fringes. The perianth is 2½–4 cm (1.0–1.6 in) long, curved towards the center of the flower head in bud. It is initially yellow, but later changes to orange, although the colour differs across the range. Its base is fused into a tube of 6–10 mm (0.24–0.39 in) long, a bit laterally compressed, smooth near the base and with a minutely powdery covering near the top. Three of the perianth lobes coil back towards the center of the flower head, with many fine and short crinkly hairs and some long straight silky hairs. The style is 3¾–5½ cm (1½–2¼ in) long, slightly curved towards the center of the flower head, initially yellow but later turning orange. It is topped by a slight thickening that is called the pollen presenter, which is narrow or broadly cone-shaped 1½–4 mm (0.6–1.6 in) long and up to 2 cm (0.79 in) wide, with the groove that functions as the stigma central at the very tip. The four scales that subtend the ovary are triangular to awl-shaped and about 1 mm (0.039 in) long.

== Taxonomy ==
Henrik Bernard Oldenland, the Cape's master gardener of the Dutch East India Company could have been the first to collect the wart-stemmed pincushion, when he crossed the Outeniqua Mountains near Attaqua's Kloof on an expedition in 1689. The first to describe Oldenland's pincushion was Nicolaas Laurens Burman in his book Florae Capensis Prodromus, and he named it Leucadendron cuneiforme in 1768. Carl Peter Thunberg published a revision of the Proteaceae in 1781, in which he followed Carl Linnaeus in assigning all species to Protea, and he distinguished Protea elliptica. Joseph Knight published a book in 1809 titled On the cultivation of the plants belonging to the natural order of Proteeae, that contained an extensive revision of the Proteaceae attributed to Richard Anthony Salisbury. Salisbury moved Thunberg's species to his new genus Leucadendrum, calling it Leucadendrum ellipticum. In addition he recognised two slightly different forms, calling them Leucadendrum phyllanthifolium and Leucadendrum cervinum. It is assumed that Salisbury had based his review on a draft he had been studying of a paper called On the natural order of plants called Proteaceae that Robert Brown was to publish in 1810. Brown however, called the genus Leucospermum and made the new combination Leucospermum ellipticum, and further recognised a form he called Leucospermum attenuatum. The French botanist Jean Poiret assigned that last specimen to the genus Protea in 1816, making the new combination P. attenuata. Carl Meissner describe a form in 1856, which he named Leucospermum zeyheri. Otto Kuntze revised the genus in 1891 and called it Leucadendron, a homonym of a name that had already been used by Linnaeus in 1753 for another group of Proteaceae, which have separate sexes and very large bracts, making the combination Leucadendron ellipticum. Michel Gandoger finally added Leucospermum septemdentatum in 1913. In 1932, Henry Georges Fourcade realised a new combination, Leucospermum phyllanthifolium, needed to be made for Salisbury's second species. Although the variation in leaf length, leaf toothing and size of the flower heads in Leucospermum cuneiforme is large, and distant populations may appear to be quite distinct, the characters all change gradually, so it is not possible to determine where subtaxa might start and end. Hence, John Patrick Rourke in 1970 only recognises one variable species.

Leucospermum cuneiforme is the type species of the cylindric pincushions, section Crassicaudex.

The subtribe Proteinae, to which the genus Leucospermum has been assigned, consistently has a basic chromosome number of twelve (2n=24).

The species name cuneiforme is compounded from the Latin words cuneus, meaning "wedge" and forma, meaning "form", combined "wedge-shaped". The Afrikaans name luisiesbos "lice bush" comes from the similarity of the seed pods to species of lice.

== Distribution, habitat and ecology ==
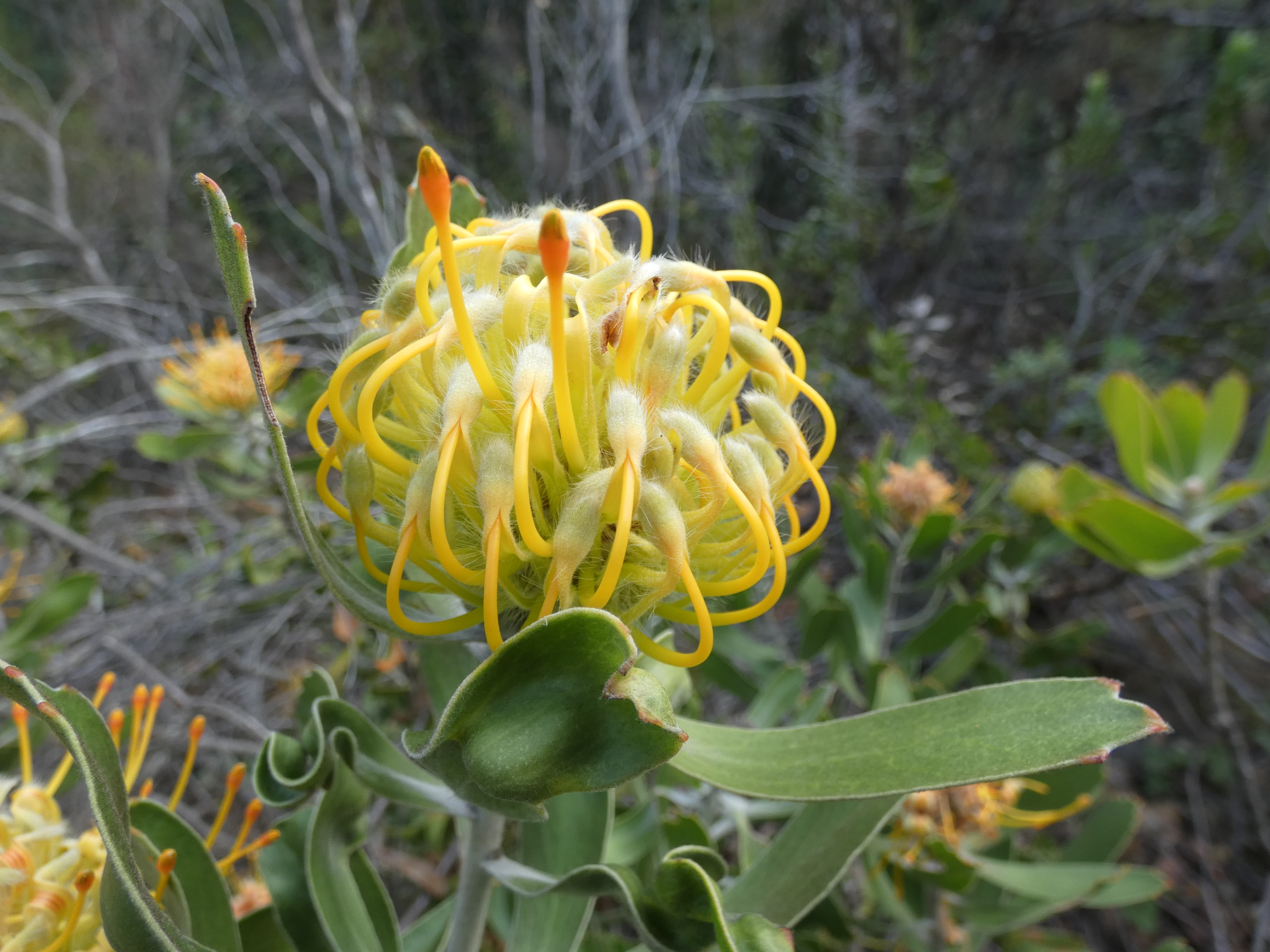
Early flowering stage when the pollen presenter is still encased by the perianth claws like a cap

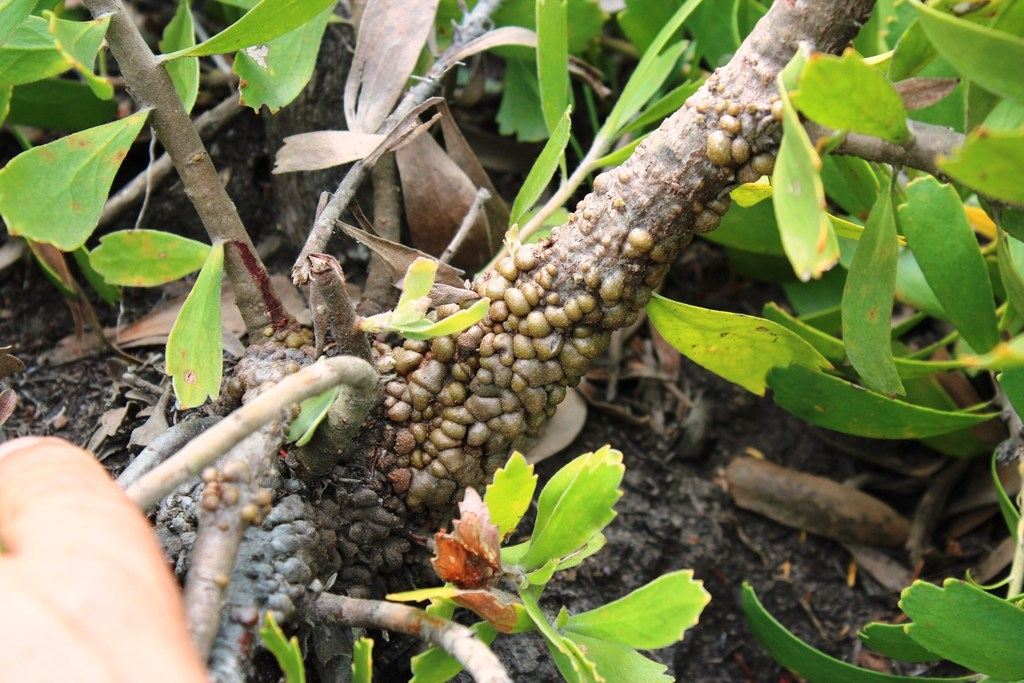
The wart-like swellings on older stems are a unique feature of this pincushion species.

L. cuneiforme has the largest distribution area of the entire genus, and can be found all along the southern coast of the Western Cape and Eastern Cape provinces, and the adjacent mountain ranges between Greyton (Caledon district) in the west and Qolora Mouth in Transkei in the east. It occurs in various climatic circumstances with both dominant rain in winter or summer or without a clear-cut peak. The distribution includes Riviersonderend, Potberg, Langeberg Range, Outeniqua and Swartberg Mountains. It can grow in sclerophyll fynbos, such as on the south-facing slopes of the Langeberg together with other Proteaceae, Erica species, Rutaceae and Restionaceae, but also on grassveld, and subtropical dune forests in the Eastern Cape, where it grows together with plants like Phoenix reclinata and Stangeria eriopus, on the arid fringe of the Little Karoo and the wet margins of the temperate evergreen forests near Knysna and Tsitsikama. It does however stick to poor sandy soils derived from Table Mountain Sandstone, Witteberg Quartzite and stabilised sandy Tertiary deposits. It can be found at sea-level as well as up to over 1,000 m (3,300 ft) altitude. L. cuneiforme is one of the most fire resistant pincushions. Although fire kills the above ground parts of the plant, multiple branches sprout from the rootstock. Mostly, the frequency of the fires makes sure shrubs generally are only ½–1 m (1½–3 ft), but when left unchecked, it develops a dominant stem and grows to about 3 m (9.8 ft). Some flowers can be found all year round, but there is a distinct peak from August till February. The unscented but conspicuously coloured flower heads are pollinated by birds that feed on the nectar, such as the Cape sugarbird and some species of sunbird. The birds sit on the flower head and stick their long bills into perianth tubes and so bring their heads and necks in contact with the pollen presenters. Although the flowers are also visited by insects, these do not touch the pollen presenters so do not contribute to the pollination.

The seeds are covered in a pale fleshy coating called elaiosome that attracts ants. About two months after flowering, the seeds are ripe and get released from the flower heads, and native ants gather them and carry them to their underground nests. Here, the elaiosome is consumed. The remaining seed is big, slick and hard and the ants cannot remove it. This way the seeds are safe from seed-eaters and fire. This seed dispersal strategy is called myrmecochory. After a fire, the seeds promptly germinate. So, L. cuneiforme has two strategies to survive a fire: myrmecochory and resprouting from the rootstock.

== Cultivation ==
L. cuneiforme is used as an ornamental shrub and is also cultivated as cut flower. There are a few cultivars, such as "Goldie", in addition to several hybrids of L. cuneiforme with other species.
