= Joe Matthews =

Joe Matthews may refer to:

- Joe Matthews (baseball) (1898–1968), American professional baseball player
- Joe Matthews (politician) (1929–2010), South African activist and politician

== See also ==
- Joey Matthews (born 1979), American professional wrestler
- Joseph Matthews (disambiguation)
