= Henry Georges Fourcade =

South African surveyor and botanist (1865–1948)

- Born: 8 July 1865; Bordeaux, France
- Died: 19 January 1948 (aged 82); Humansdorp, South Africa
- Scientific career
- Fields: Surveying, forestry, photogrammetry, botany

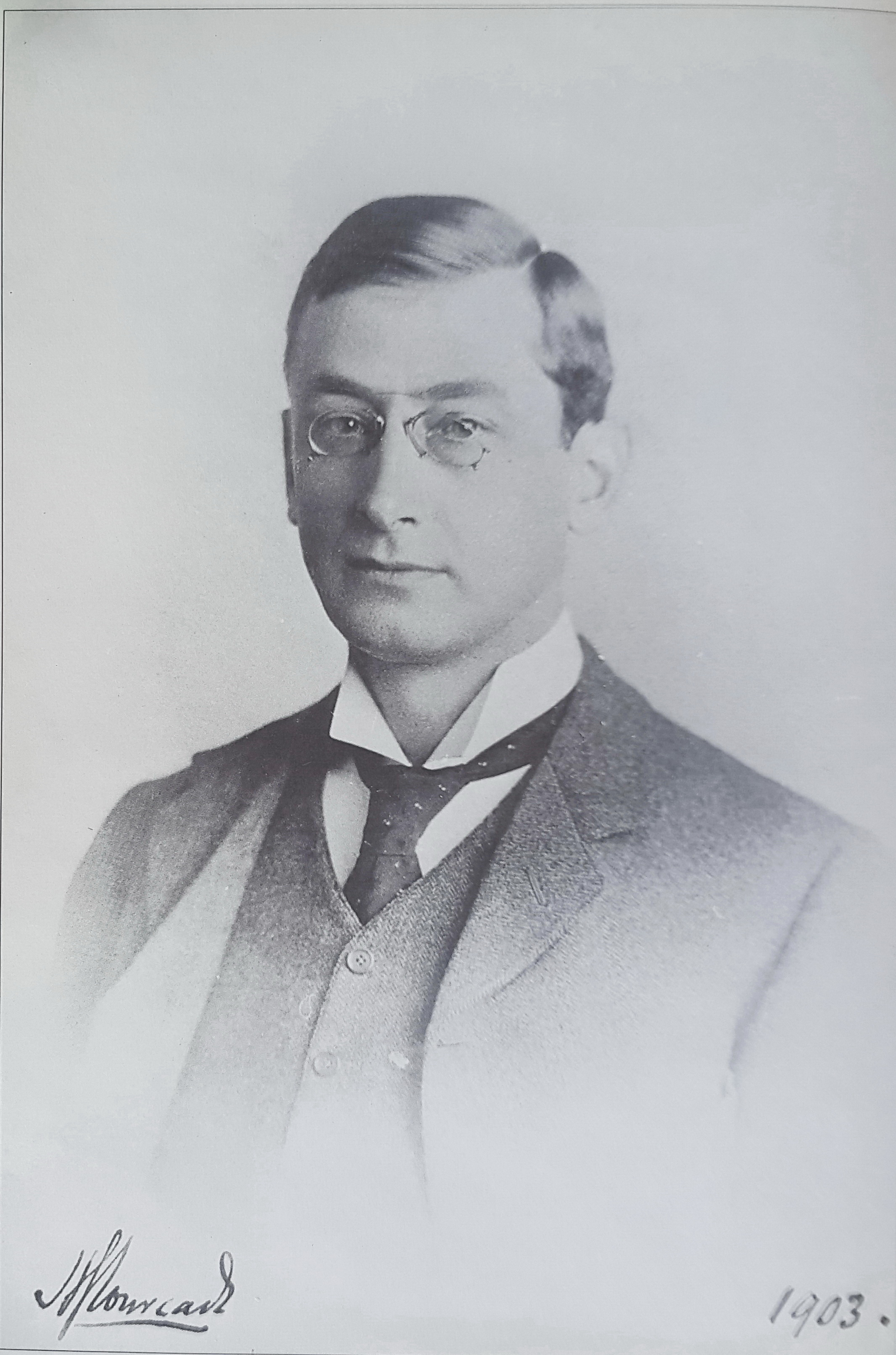

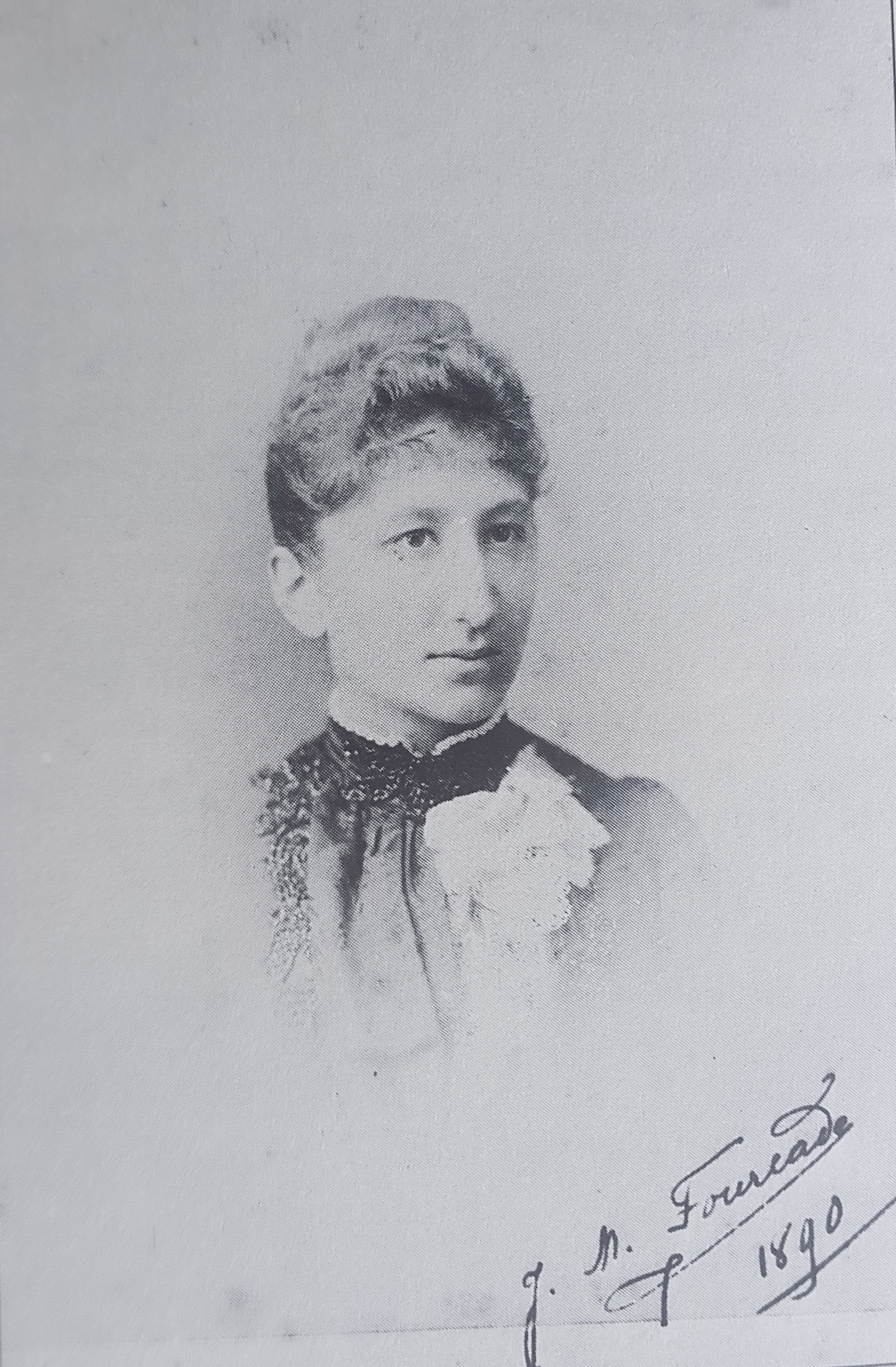
Jeanne Marie Fourcade, Henry's elder sister

Henry Georges Fourcade (1865-1948), also known as Henri Georges Fourcade and sometimes Georges Henri Fourcade, was a surveyor, forester, pioneer of photogrammetry and as botanist, a major early collector of the Southern Cape flora.

== Early life ==
Henry Georges was born at 16, Rue de Treuils, Bordeaux, the son of Justin Jadé Fourcade and Marie Prat. He had one other sibling, his older sister Jeanne Marie. His father was a general storekeeper, who soon moved to Yokohama, Japan and became an importer of wines and liqueurs, where the family lived at No. 10 on the Bund or waterfront. When he was twelve, he returned to France to finish his secondary school education, obtaining a school-leaving certificate just after turning fourteen, winning the first prize in ethics, as well as a prize in physics and chemistry. The next year he attended technikon and obtained good results in English, French, German, arithmetic, chemistry and commerce. In late-1880, Mrs. Fourcade, for reasons unknown, set sail for Table Bay, in the Cape colony. She returned to France a year or two later, but her children remained in Cape Town. Henry Georges enrolled at the South African College, doing a course in the Theory of Land Surveying.

== Forestry ==
In July 1882, having just turned 17, Fourcade took up an appointment with the Cape Colony's Forestry Department, serving under its first Superintendent of Woods and Forests, Médéric de Vasselot de Régné, originally from the French National School of Forestry at Nancy. With de Vasselot, Fourcade studied forest science and management, acquiring knowledge about the climate, soils and indigenous trees.

De Vasselot boasted about the progress shown by his protégé and put Fourcade in charge of the departmental herbarium. A few months later, he was sent to Knysna, with the task of surveying and then sectioning the forest into manageable parts. He performed this job well, training the existing marksmen to comply with new regulations that had come into force and that were designed to make the forest sustainable. This early exposure to the practical side of sawmilling and forest management would become very valuable years later, when he had his own sawmilling business. In an era of indiscriminate felling of trees, he stressed the risks inherent in upsetting the balance of nature by felling one or two species of tree only, pointing out that such selective fellings would undermine the principle of removing mature growth to improve conditions for young growth in the forest. By 1886, the area sectioned under Fourcade amounted to 12 814 hectares, outperforming his colleagues. In his annual report, he proposed a few allotments to be allocated to bona fide wood-cutters near the then new Millwood goldfield.

In 1876, gold had been discovered in the Knysna Forest – see Millwood, South Africa. Prospectors flocked to the area and a town rapidly came into being. It had a post office, six hotels, three newspapers, many shops and a law court. The impact on the forest was quite dramatic. Fourcade had to watch more or less helplessly how up to 600 men lived in the forest, with timber theft rife. The Conservator of Knysna had limited jurisdiction over the forests until the Forest Act of 1888 was passed. In the intervening period, ruination of forest land was tolerated by the Civil Commissioner, a Maximillian Jackson, who many a time found himself at loggerheads with Fourcade. In what was to become a pattern in later life, Fourcade, who did not shy away from confrontation, spoke his mind clearly and once delivered a curt reply so stinging to the Commissioner that it led to accusations of 'insolence and insubordinate conduct'. Despite this, the quality of his work impressed his opponents. Fourcade was punctilious and appeared to have little time for fools. These character traits earned him ample hardships during his long life, but despite this his motivation never flagged. He was very good at written communication and sometimes continued fighting battles long after the other party had conceded defeat. The last round of the clash with the Commissioner was concluded as follows: "I am sure that Mr Jackson has tact enough if he chooses to enable me to avoid further friction" (Storrar 1990a, p. 28). Mr Jackson probably did exercise a lot of tact, as a few years later he invited Fourcade to join him for lunch with the Governor, Alfred Milner and the Mayor of Knysna, an exclusive event for just four people. All that was still in the future. At the time, there was public concern about the depletion of the Natal Colony's forests. A request had been made to the Governor for expert assistance and advice. De Vasselot had wanted to go himself, with Fourcade as his First Assistant, but that plan was scuppered when the Natal Government didn't provide enough funds.

=== The Report on the Natal Forests ===
In March 1889, Fourcade left for Natal on his own, with a mandate to report on the condition of the indigenous forests on Crown or Trust lands; to advise on the feasibility of creating artificial forests and to report on the supply of timber for use by the railways. Upon arrival at Durban, he was met by the botanist John Medley Wood, who provided him with his analytical key of Natal plants, Colonel Bowker, a keen naturalist and writer, and Richard Vause, co-founder of the Natal Mercury paper and also past Mayor of Durban – all waiting in person. This may well have been the most harmonious period in Fourcade's life. It was certainly the highlight of his career as a forestry officer. He was welcomed by the Natal Government, given transport and made a member of several clubs, introduced to all the magistrates of the districts included in his brief and had the railway workshops at his disposal. He was free to employ his skills and knowledge without hindrance from anyone and quickly demonstrated an immense capacity for hard work. The work included inspecting each forest's climate, average altitude, area and extent, soils, rock, tree species and surface growth. He had to assess the extent of damage by exploitation, fire or sapling depletion (by local hut builders or herders with grazing animals). The quality of the prose in the report shows that he was passionate about the state of the forests. He reconstructed how particular sequences of events had to have happened for forests to be in the state he found them. He took nearly 300 specimens of wood from about 70 species of trees for testing. The Report on the Natal Forests, which was published on 3 December 1889, towers over both the previous and later reports by other authors. It discusses the Natal forests, their utility and protection, management as well as plantations, and organisation of staff and works. It contains a list of 167 species of tree indigenous to Natal; mechanical constants determined by experiment of the hardness, density, elasticity coefficient, elasticity limit, breaking stress; notes on the preparation of wood and railway sleeper manufacture, a list of trees with high bark tannin content, measurements of rates of growth for indigenous trees, timber measurements, recommendations for vegetation from other countries that would be suitable for acclimatisation in Natal as forest vegetation, the altitude ranges at which some 91 species of exotic tree were found, statistics of timber imports for the decade 1880 to 1889 as well as a short extract on 'diminished rainfall' that the Governor had requested, concerning the theory that there might be a link between sunspots and rainfall. All the work was done in 10 months. Fourcade was 24 years old. The report was tabled in Parliament to an enthusiastic response:

Of all the official documents that have been presented to the Legislative Council this session, by far the most interesting is the "Report of the Natal Forests" by Mr. H. G. Fourcade of the Cape Service, who was appointed early last year to perform the work of which this report is the representation and the result .... No one who reads this report will or can doubt his complete competency for the task committed to him. He has produced a monograph of immediate utility, absorbing interest, of abiding value. We have read the 95 pages of the report with unflagging attention, and benefit; and that is more than might be said of most Blue-books. These pages are pregnant with instructive and suggestive matter that it is impossible to take more than a cursory survey of them in this column. To be appreciated and understood, as it deserves to be, the whole report must be read.

— Storrar 1990a, p. 38, quoting from the leading article of the Natal Mercury, 27 May 1890.

Almost all his recommendations were adopted: The appointment of a conservator of forests was approved; a proclamation protected ironwood, stinkwood and yellowwoods; and the forests were shut down for 16 months. Fourcade was offered the new post, but he turned it down and returned to Cape Town. A year later, the report was still in the news, being regarded as the only Government publication that was ever seen to have been taken "on a railway journey to relieve the monotony of travel on the Natal line" (Storrar 1990a, p. 39, quoting from the Natal Witness)

Upon his return, Fourcade's work environment changed as one senior colleague retired and another died. In the ensuing departmental reorganisation, he was promised the post of Conservator in charge of Surveys and accordingly decided to complete his long-deferred Practical Survey examination. This he passed, but the arrangement fell through when a junior colleague was appointed instead and Fourcade returned to Knysna, still not having completed all the requirements of the Land Surveyor's qualification. Fourcade would stay with the Forestry Department for another decade, but as subsequent events show, his career as a Forestry Officer was effectively over.

== Surveying ==
In the years 1891–1899, Fourcade was employed essentially as a surveyor, demarcating the Knysna forest area. In March 1892, he had an inspiration to attempt a delicate and skilled exercise in higher surveying. This would normally be permitted only to a very experienced and specially trained surveyor. Fourcade set himself the task of performing the secondary triangulation of the Outeniqua-Zitzikamma area, to test his idea of connecting all forest surveys to the Colony's Geodetic Survey network. He requested books and mathematical tables from the Assistant Commissioner and immersed himself in the work. In the same year, he also presented a modest first paper to the South African Philosophical Society, which had to do with repetitive angle measurements in triangulation work. He soon became a member. The Society (as well as its successor, the Royal Society of South Africa) were to eventually publish 14 of his papers, over a period of 50 years, despite a sometimes strained relationship (Storrar 1990a, p. 50).

- The Outeniqua – Zitzikamma – Langkloof secondary triangulation
- The Sandflats – Alexandria secondary triangulation
- The 1904 map of Devil's Peak, revisited in 1985
- Private Land Surveying

== Financial Independence ==
- Farming at Ratel's Bosch
- The Zitzikamma Saw Mill
- Witte Els Bosch
- The Fourcade Bequest

== Botany ==
Fourcade had collected sporadically in the 1880s and also during the visit to Natal. Each time however, his specimens were lost. In 1905, he began a personal herbarium and by 1910, he had collected several hundred species, being a keen collector. It was only in 1920, when he was 55, that Fourcade took up Botany seriously, upon invitation by Selmar Schonland, who established the Botany Department at Rhodes University. The next 20 years would see him collaborate with a number of herbaria, build up close professional relationships with the leading botanists of the time and become a major collector of the Southern Cape floristic region.

- The Bolus Herbarium
- Kew Gardens

Botanical species named by Fourcade include:

- Acanthaceae: Justicia acuta (C.B.Clarke) Fourc., Justicia rubicunda (Hochst.) Fourc.
- Aizoaceae: Ruschia stenophylla (L.Bolus) L.Bolus ex Fourc.
- Aloaceae: Haworthia chloracantha var. monticola (Fourc.) Halda, Haworthia monticola Fourc., Haworthia monticola var. asema M.B.Bayer
- Apiaceae: Centella verticillata (Thunb.) Fourc.
- Apocynaceae: Carissa cordata (Mill.) Fourc.
- Asclepiadaceae: Tylophora cordata (Thunb.) Fourc.
- Asphodelaceae: Bulbine altissima (Mill.) Fourc.
- Asteraceae: Aster corymbosus (Harv.) Fourc., Aster corymbosus [Dryand.], Aster outeniquae Fourc., Aster venustus Fourc., Aster westae Fourc., Berkheya echinopoda (DC.) Fourc., Elytropappus cernuus (Thunb.) Fourc., Felicia westiae (Fourc.) Grau, Hertia kraussii (Sch.Bip.) Fourc., Ifloga glomerata (Harv.) Fourc., Osteospermum decumbens Fourc., Pentzia pilulifera (L.f.) Fourc., Peyrousea umbellata (L.f.) Fourc., Pteronia teretifolia (Thunb.) Fourc., Senecio denticulatus (Thunb.) Fourc., Senecio dissidens Fourc., Senecio dumosus Fourc., Senecio litorosus Fourc., Senecio othonniformis Fourc.
- Brassicaceae: Brachycarpaea capensis (L.) Fourc., Heliophila cornigera Fourc.
- Campanulaceae: Lobelia sylvatica Fourc., Prismatocarpus rogersii Fourc., Prismatocarpus virgatus Fourc.
- Chenopodiaceae: Arthrocnemum africanum Moss ex Fourc., Arthrocnemum heptiflorum Moss ex Fourc., Arthrocnemum perenne (Mill.) Moss ex Fourc.
- Convolvulaceae: Cuscuta alpestris Fourc.
- Crassulaceae: Cotyledon flavida Fourc., Cotyledon leucothrix (C.A.Sm.) Fourc.
- Cucurbitaceae: Kedrostis angulata (Berg.) Fourc.
- Cyperaceae: Ficinia dispar (Spreng.) Fourc., Ficinia marginata (Thunb.) Fourc., Ficinia pseudoschoenus (Steud.) Fourc., Scirpus striatus (Nees) Fourc.
- Frankeniaceae: Frankenia repens (Bergius) Fourc.
- Geraniaceae: Pelargonium gracillimum Fourc., Pelargonium mollicomum Fourc.
- Hyacinthaceae: Dipcadi brevifolium (Thunb.) Fourc., Lachenalia haarlemensis Fourc., Lachenalia subspicata Fourc., Massonia modesta Fourc., Ornithogalum capillifolium Fourc., Ornithogalum limosum Fourc., Ornithogalum petraeum Fourc.
- Hypoxidaceae: Spiloxene alba (L.f.) Fourc., Spiloxene aquatica (L.f.) Fourc., Spiloxene minuta (L.f.) Fourc., Spiloxene trifurcillata (Nel) Fourc.
- Iridaceae: Anapalina longituba Fourc., Hesperantha linearis (Jacq.) Fourc., Tritonia chrysantha Fourc., Tritoniopsis longituba (Fourc.) Goldblatt
- Leguminosae: Cyclopia aurea Fourc., Indigofera glabella Fourc., Indigofera grisophylla Fourc., Indigofera pappei Fourc., Indigofera rhodantha Fourc., Psoralea heterosepala Fourc., Vigna debilis Fourc.
- Orchidaceae: Acrolophia capensis (P.J.Bergius) Fourc., Acrolophia capensis (P.J.Bergius) Fourc. var. lamellata (Lindl.) Schelpe, Herschelia lacera (Sw.) Fourc.
- Plantaginaceae: Plantago litoraria Fourc.
- Poaceae: Afrachneria steudelii (Nees) Fourc., Panicum stapfianum Fourc.
- Polygalaceae: Muraltia mitior (Bergius) Levyns ex Fourc.
- Proteaceae: Leucadendron album (Thunb.) Fourc., Leucadendron laureolum (Lam.) Fourc., Leucospermum cordifolium (Knight) Fourc., Leucospermum phyllanthifolium (Knight) Fourc., Paranomus reflexus (Phillips & Hutch.) Fourc., Protea eximia (Knight) Fourc., Protea lorifolia (Knight) Fourc.
- Rafflesiaceae: Cytinus sanguineus (Thunb.) Fourc.
- Rhamnaceae: Phylica curvifolia (Presl) Pillans ex Fourc.
- Rutaceae: Agathosma cryptocarpa Fourc., Agathosma phylicoides Fourc., Agathosma puberula (Steud.) Fourc., Agathosma unicarpellata (Fourc.) Pillans, Barosma unicarpellata Fourc.
- Sapindaceae: Allophylus spicatus (Thunb.) Fourc.
- Scrophulariaceae: Diascia patens (Thunb.) Grant ex Fourc., Nemesia denticulata (Benth.) Grant ex Fourc., Sutera atrocaerulea Fourc., Sutera tenuifolia (Bernh.) Fourc.
- Solanaceae: Solanum macowani Fourc.
- Sterculiaceae: Hermannia lacera (E.Mey. ex Harv.) Fourc.
- Thymelaeaceae: Lachnaea glomerata Fourc.
- Urticaceae: Australina caffra (Thunb.) Fourc.

== Photogrammetry ==
- Invention of a stereoscopic method of photographic surveying
- The Fourcade Correspondence theorem
- Patents & instruments
- MI4 and aerial reconnaissance

== Honors ==
- Honorary Doctor of Science, University of Cape Town, 1930.
- Honorary Doctor of Science, University of South Africa, 1947.
- Botanical species named after Fourcade:
  - Amphithalea fourcadei Compton
  - Aspalathus fourcadei L.Bolus
  - Babiana fourcadei G.J.Lewis
  - Centella fourcadei Adamson
  - Corymbium africanum L. subsp. scabridum (P.J.Bergius) Weitz var. fourcadei (Hutch.) Weitz
  - Dianthus basuticus Burtt Davy subsp. fourcadei S.S.Hooper
  - Drosanthemum fourcadei (L.Bolus) Schwantes
  - Erica glandulosa Thunb. subsp. fourcadei (L.Bolus) E.G.H.Oliv. & I.M.Oliv. previously Erica fourcadei L.Bolus
  - Geissorhiza fourcadei (L.Bolus) G.J.Lewis
  - Gladiolus fourcadei (L.Bolus) Goldblatt & M.P.de Vos
  - Gnidia fourcadei Moss
  - Helichrysum fourcadei Hilliard
  - Nemesia fourcadei K.E.Steiner
  - Oxalis fourcadei T.M.Salter
  - Phylica debilis Eckl. & Zeyh. var. fourcadei Pillans
  - Phylica fourcadei Pillans
  - Ruschia fourcadei L.Bolus
  - Sebaea fourcadei Marais
  - Selago fourcadei Hilliard
  - Tetraria fourcadei Turrill & Schönland
  - Trichodiadema fourcadei L.Bolus
  - Watsonia fourcadei J.W.Mathews & L.Bolus
- The Fourcade Museum at Witte Els Bosch
- The Fourcade Trail near Jeffreys Bay
- Mount Fourcade (latitude: 64° 36' S longitude: 62° 30' W) on the west coast of Graham Land, Antarctica. UK-APC, 1960.
