= Felicia westae =

Scientific classification
- Kingdom: Plantae
- Clade: Tracheophytes
- Clade: Angiosperms
- Clade: Eudicots
- Clade: Asterids
- Order: Asterales
- Family: Asteraceae
- Genus: Felicia
- Section: Felicia sect. Anhebecarpaea
- Species: F. westae

Binomial name
- Felicia westae (Fourc.) Grau

Synonyms
- Aster westae

Shrublet in the daisy family from South Africa

Felicia westae is a sparsely branched shrub growing up to 40 cm (1 1/3 ft) tall, that is assigned to the family Asteraceae. The lower parts of the stems have lost their leaves and the upper part has many crowded, upwardly angled and curved, alternate leaves pressed against the stem, with the edges curled inward. The flower heads form at the tips of the branches, each about 3 1/3 cm (1 1/3 in) across, with about twenty purplish blue ray florets surrounding many yellow disc florets. It is only known from a small area in the Eastern Cape province of South Africa.

== Description ==
Felicia westae is a low, up to 40 cm (1 1/3 ft) high, sparsely branched shrub. The lower parts of the stem are largely hairless, the higher parts are crowded with arched upturned leaves. The leaves are line- to lance-shaped, 16–18 mm (0.63–0.71 in) long and 1–1 1/2 mm (0.04-0.06 in) wide, the surfaces hairless, and the bristly serrated margins curled upward and towards each other.

The flower heads are set individually on short, up to 1 cm (2/5 in) long stalks, which are set with thin white bristles. Surrounding each flower head are three to four whorls of bracts (or phyllaries) that together form the so-called involucre, which is up to 13 mm (0.51 in) in diameter. These bracts are of different length, lance-shaped, about 8–10 mm (0.31–0.39 in) long and approximately 1 1/2 mm (0.06 in) wide, with a bristly margin and glands. Each head contains about twenty female ray florets, each with closed, tubular part at the base that is hairy in its upper part and a purplish blue strap of about 10 mm (2/5 in) long and 2 mm (0.079 in) wide. These surround numerous bisexual disc florets with a yellow corolla of about 4 mm (0.16 in) long, hairy in the middle. In the center of each corolla are five anthers merged into a tube, through which the style grows when the floret opens, hoovering up the pollen on its shaft. At the tip of both style branches is a narrowly triangular appendage. Surrounding the base of the corolla are many, yellowish white, shallowly serrated, more or less deciduous pappus bristles, all about equal in length at 6 mm (0.24 in). The eventually yellowish brown to reddish, dry, one-seeded, indehiscent fruits called cypselae are oval in outline, about 3.2 mm (0.13 in) long and 1.2 mm (0.047 in) wide, with a weak ridge along the margin. The cypselae of the ray florets are hairless, those of the disc florets short-haired.

== Taxonomy ==
This species of Felicia was first described by Henry Georges Fourcade in 1932, based on a specimen he collected in 1928. He named it Aster westae. Jürke Grau in his 1973 Revision of the genus Felicia (Asteraceae), reassigned the species and made the combination Felicia westae. The species is considered to be part of the section Anhebecarpaea.

== Distribution, habitat and conservation ==
Felicia westae was known from many observations near Humansdorp in the southwest of the Eastern Cape province of South Africa, where it occurred on river banks in low-lying areas near the coast. It grows in vegetation types called Tsitsikamma Sandstone Fynbos and Garden Route Shale Fynbos. It is considered to be endangered because its habitat suffered from expanding agriculture and timber plantations, while on the riverbanks it is out-competed by invasive plant species. After 1944 it was no longer found until it was rediscovered in 2015 along a few tributaries of the Tsitsikamma River.
