= Joseph William Mathews =

Joseph William "Jimmy" Mathews (7 April 1871 - 23 September 1949) was a horticulturist and gardener from England who served as the first curator of the Kirstenbosch national botanical garden in Cape Town, South Africa.

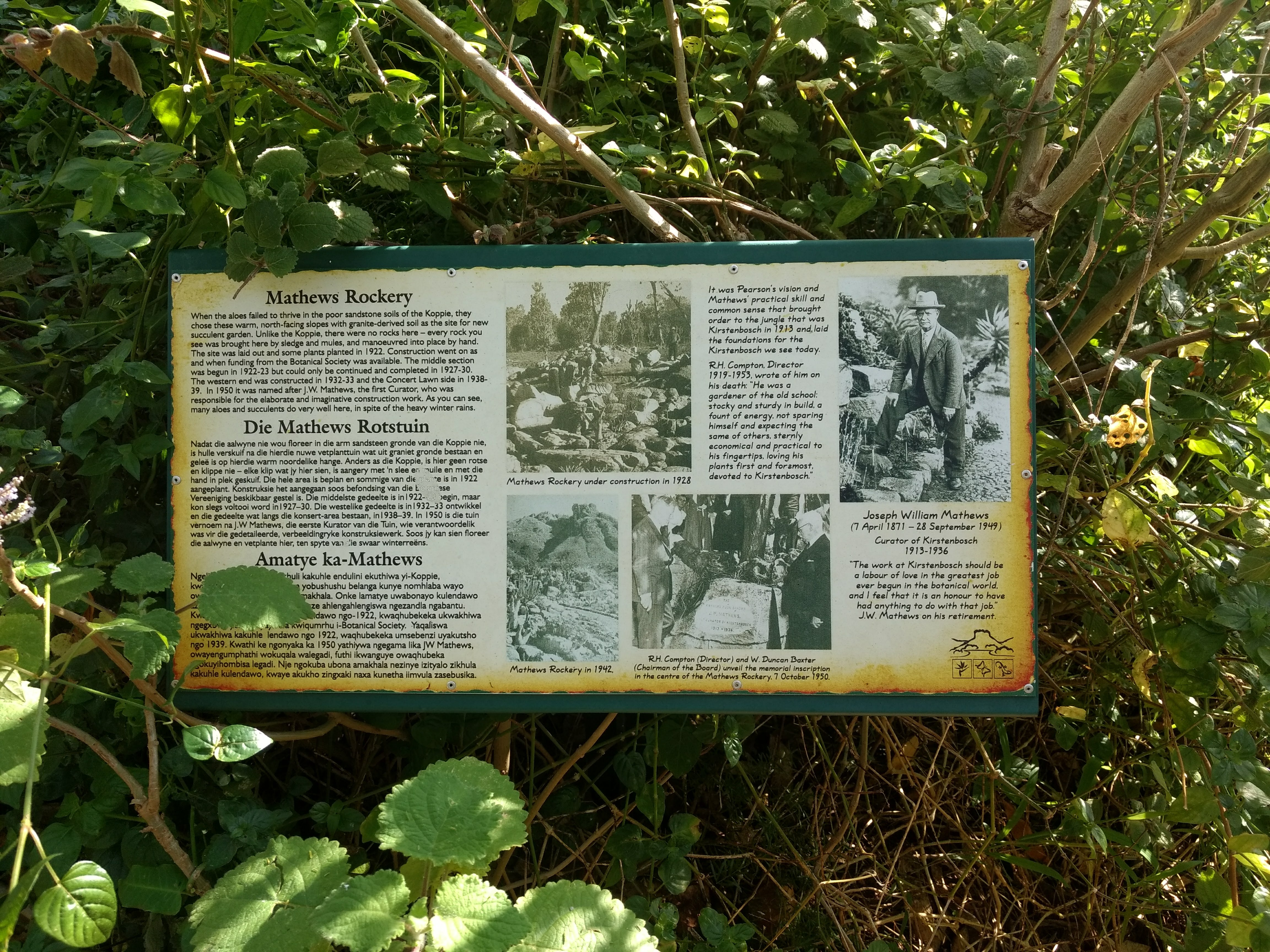
Display at the Mathews Rockery in Kirstenbosch botanical garden

Mathews was born in Bunbury, Cheshire to Robert Mathews and Mary Elizabeth. He trained in horticulture at the Kew botanical gardens and went to work in the Cape Town public gardens in 1895. In 1913, the botanical garden at Kirstenbosch was established and Mathews was appointed the curator under the directorship of Professor H.H.W. Pearson. Mathew cultivated and encouraged the use of numerous local plants including several bulbs. He published notes on the culture of many of the local plants. He retired in 1936 but continued to write and published on the Cultivation of non-succulent South African plants (Cape Town, 1938).

The rockery at Kirstenbosch is named after him as are the plant species Geissorhiza mathewsii and Tritonia mathewsiana.
