= Terence Macleane Salter =

(1883–1969) British/ South African botanist

Captain Terence Macleane Salter
- Born: 5 February 1883; Cheltenham, Gloucester, United Kingdom
- Died: 30 March 1969 (aged 86); Cape Town, South Africa
- Known for: Cape flora
- Scientific career
- Fields: Botany
- Institutions: Royal Navy; Bolus Herbarium, Cape Town
- Author abbrev. (botany): T.M.Salter

Terence Macleane Salter (5 February 1883 – 30 March 1969) was a British/South African plant collector and botanist. Among the plant taxa named in his honor are the genus Saltera (Penaeaceae) and the orchid Disa salteri.

== Biography ==
Salter was the second child of Emily Susannah Wilding and James Colam Salter. He was born in Cheltenham, Gloucestershire, England. He joined the Royal Navy in 1900 and was promoted to assistant paymaster in 1901. He served aboard HMS Majestic in Gibraltar. He became paymaster-captain in 1916.

He was stationed at Naval Base Simon's Town, South Africa, from 1927 until his retirement in 1931 at the rank of Paymaster Commander. During his commission in Simon's Town, he collected mainly from the Cape area. The specimens he collected during this period were added to the herbarium collection at the Royal Botanic Gardens, Kew and the Natural History Museum, London.

After his emigration to South Africa in 1935, he resumed his collecting work, for the herbarium collections of South African National Biodiversity Institute and the Bolus Herbarium until 1957.

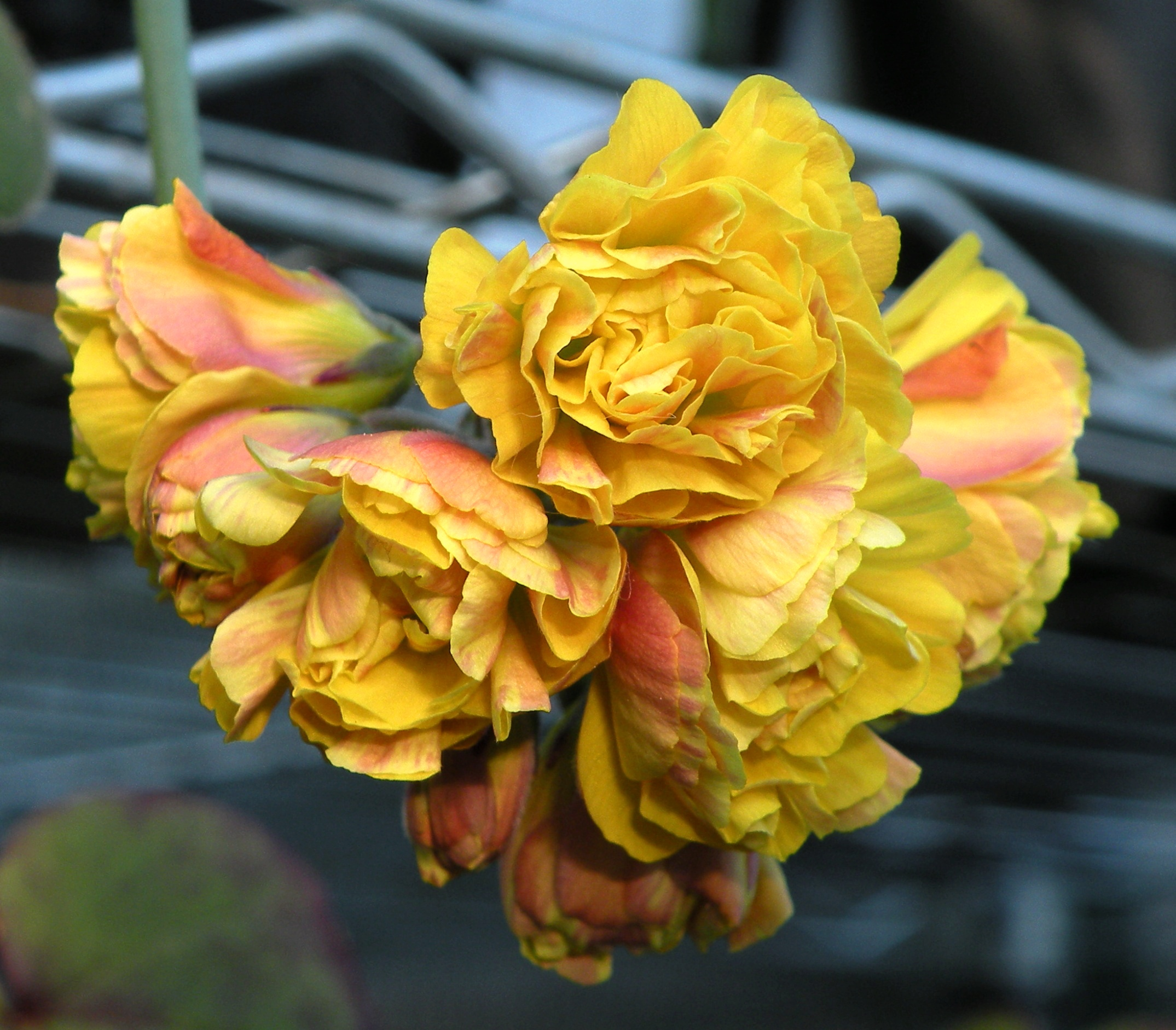
Double-flowered Oxalis compressa

He worked with Robert Stephen Adamson, with whom he published the Flora of the Cape Peninsula in 1950. He was employed at the Bolus Herbarium until 1960, during which time he became a specialist on the Cape flora, in particular the genus Oxalis.

He died in Cape Town at an age of 86 years old.

== Eponyms ==
Salter has several plant taxa named in his honor, including the genus Saltera (Penaeaceae), the orchid Disa salteri, Lachenalia salteri, Lampranthus salteri and Oxalis salteri.

== Selected publications ==
- Notes on some of the species of Drosera occurring in the cape Peninsula, including the new species D. glabripes (Harv.) Salter and D. curviscapa Salter, 1939
- The genus Oxalis in South Africa, a taxonomic revision, 1944

== See also ==
- Felicia nordenstamii
