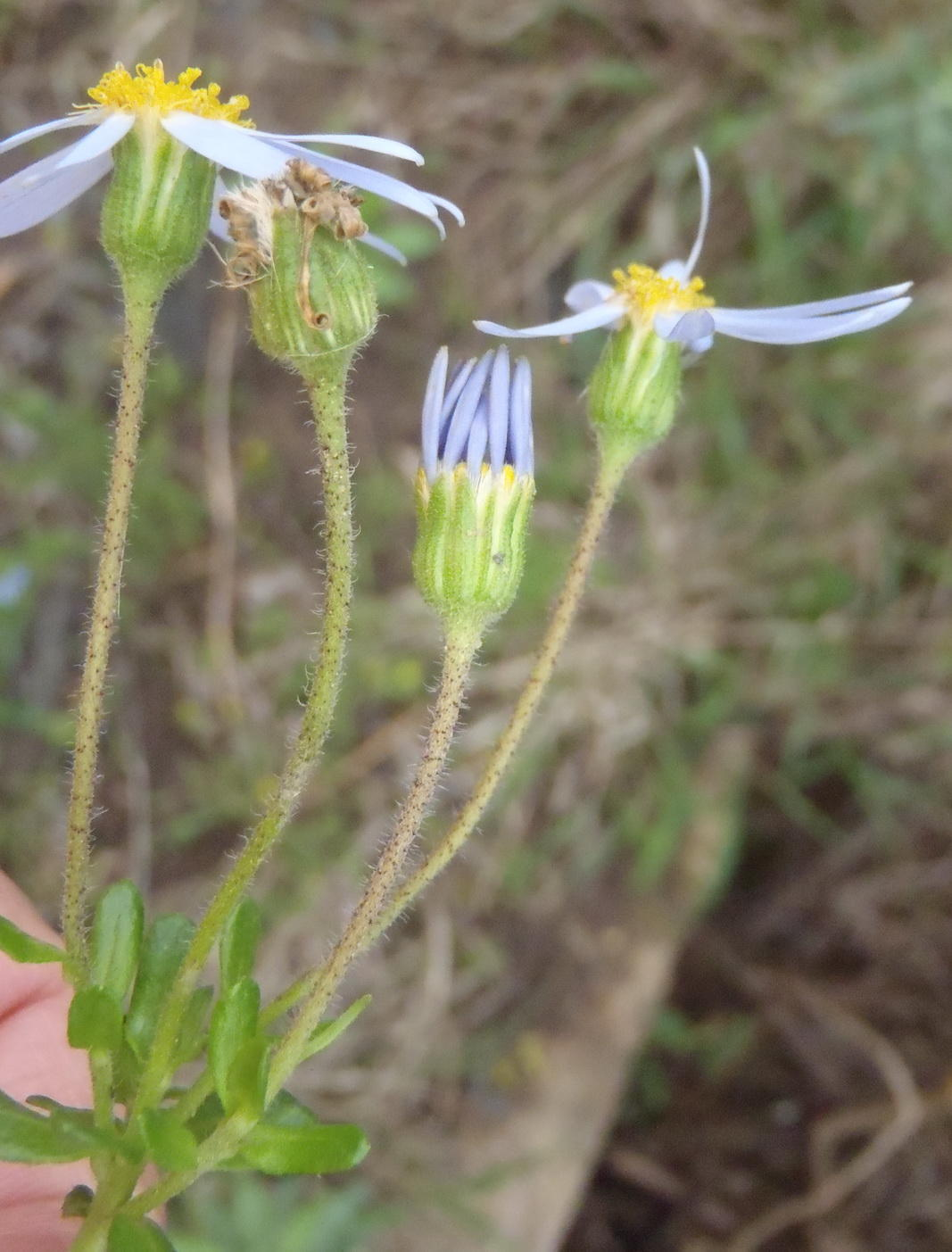
- Felicia aethiopica subsp. ecklonis

Scientific classification
- Kingdom: Plantae
- Clade: Tracheophytes
- Clade: Angiosperms
- Clade: Eudicots
- Clade: Asterids
- Order: Asterales
- Family: Asteraceae
- Genus: Felicia
- Section: Felicia sect. Neodetris
- Species: F. aethiopica

Binomial name
- Felicia aethiopica (Burm.f.) Bolus & Wolley-Dod

Subspecies
- subsp. aethiopica; subsp. ecklonis (Less.) Grau

Synonyms
- Aster aethiopicus, Aster capensis; Agathaea microphylla, Cineraria microphylla; Cineraria trachyphylla; Agathaea kraussii, Agathaea amelloides β kraussii, Aster kraussii; Aster aethiopicus var. glandulosus

= Felicia aethiopica =

Shrublet in the daisy family from South Africa

Felicia aethiopica is a low shrublet of up to about 50 cm (1 2/3 ft) high that is assigned to the family Asteraceae. It has rigid, leathery, inverted egg-shaped leaves, with only the lowest pair set oppositely. It has flower heads with an involucre of about 8 mm (1/3 in) in diameter with bracts that each contain three resin ducts, and have one whorl of twelve to fourteen ray florets with about 11 mm long and 1½ mm wide blue straps surrounding many yellow disc florets. The plant is called wild aster or dwarf Felicia in English, and wilde-aster or bloublombossie in Afrikaans. Flowering occurs year-round. Wild aster can be found in the Western and Eastern Cape provinces of South Africa.

== Description ==
Felicia aethiopica subsp. aethiopica is a low, up to 50 cm (1 2/3 ft) high, branched shrublet. Its shoots are loosely hairy to glandular. The lower stems are covered by reddish bark. The rigidly leathery leaves mostly set alternately along the stems, only those at base are oppositely set (rarely also higher on the shoot opposite), usually standing out at a straight angle, those lower on the stem even often weakly descending. The leaves are narrow to broadly elliptic to inverted egg-shaped, 5–20 mm (1/5–4/5 in) long and 2–8 mm (0.079–0.315 in) wide, with rolled down margins, hairless to strong bristly hairy and glandular, and anything intermediate.

The flower heads sit individually on the clearly distinguished inflorescence stalks that are mostly richly glandular near the top. The bracts surrounding the head that jointly form the involucre of up to 8 mm (1/3 in) in diameter, are arranged in two whorls. The bracts of the inner whorl are Inverted lance-shaped, about 5 mm (0.20 in) long and 1 mm (0.039 in) wide, ribbed, and a little bristly. The outer bracts are lance-shaped, about 6 mm (0.24 in) long and 1 mm wide, with three sunken resin ducts, and consistent with the indumentum of the leaves, variously bristly hairy or also glandular. About twelve to fourteen female ray florets have a blue strap of ligula of about 11 mm (0.43 in) long and 1½ mm (0.06 in) wide, blue. These surround many bisexual, disc florets with a yellow corolla of about 4 mm (0.16 in) long. In the center of each corolla are five free filaments and five anthers merged into a tube, through which the style grows when the floret opens, hoovering up the pollen on its shaft. At the tip of both style branches is a triangular appendage. Around the base of the corolla is one whorl of vigorous, equally long, white, shortly toothed, but smooth at their base, largely persistent pappus bristles of about 4 mm (0.16 in) long. The eventually black, dry, one-seeded, indehiscent fruits called cypselae are inverted egg-shaped to elliptic, about 3 mm (0.12 in) long and 1½ mm (0.06 in) wide, have a ridge along the outline, are hairless or rarely have a few bristles near the top, and a further smooth seedskin.

Felicia aethiopica subsp. ecklonis differs in having entirely hairy cypselae.

== Differences with related species ==
Felicia aethiopica is often confused with Felicia amoena and Felicia amelloides. F. aethiopica is a woody shrublet with mostly only the lowest pair of leaves opposite and the remainder alternate, twelve to fourteen ray florets and also can be distinguished by the three resin ducts in the involucral bracts, that lack in both other species. F. amoena is a biennial or perennial plant with at least the lowest four to six leaves in pairs as well as those at each branching, and the remainder alternate and may have up to twenty five ray florets. F. amelloides is a mostly perennial plant with all its leaves in pairs and about twelve ray florets.

== Taxonomy ==
The wild aster was first described in 1768 by Nicolaas Laurens Burman, based on a specimen in the herbarium collection of his father, the Dutch botanist and physician Johannes Burman, that had been collected at Caput Bonae Spei, a term used for the southwest of the Cape Province. He named it Aster aethiopicus. Henri Cassini in 1817 described Agathaea microphylla. In 1822, Kurt Polycarp Joachim Sprengel described Cineraria trachyphylla. In 1832, Christian Friedrich Lessing described Aster ecklonis. He also described Aster capensis, based on a herbarium sheet that contains one twig of Felicia aethiopica and two twigs of F. amelloides, and this has since created much confusion. Cassini's taxon was reassigned to the genus Cineraria by Jens Vahl, who created the combination C. microphylla in 1836. Carl Heinrich "Bipontinus" Schultz described a slightly different plant in 1843, calling it Agathaea kraussii, but he demoted it a year later to Agathaea amelloides β kraussii. In 1865, William Henry Harvey, reassigned Schultz's taxon to Aster, creating A. kraussii, but he also described Aster aethiopicus var. glandulosus. Bolus and Anthony Hurt Wolley-Dod assign the species to the genus Felicia in 1950, creating the combination Felicia aethiopica. Jürke Grau in his 1973 Revision of the genus Felicia (Asteraceae), considered tall these names synonymous, except for Aster ecklonis Less., that he considered a subspecies, calling it F. aethiopica subsp. ecklonis. The species is considered to be part of the section Neodetris.

The species name Latin aethiopica is a Latin word meaning "relating to Ethiopia or Africa in general".

== Distribution, habitat and ecology ==
Felicia aethiopica subsp. aethiopica has the smaller distribution of the subspecies. It is restricted to the Cape Peninsula, the Kogelberg area, the neighborhood of Hermanus and Gansbaai, the Potberg and near Swellendam. Subsp. ecklonis stretches from the Cedarberg in the north via the mountains near Porterville to Riviersonderend and Witsand to Natal. It grows on sandy or rocky flats and slopes.

== Conservation ==
The continued survival of both subspecies of Felicia aethiopica is considered to be of least concern because their populations are stable.
