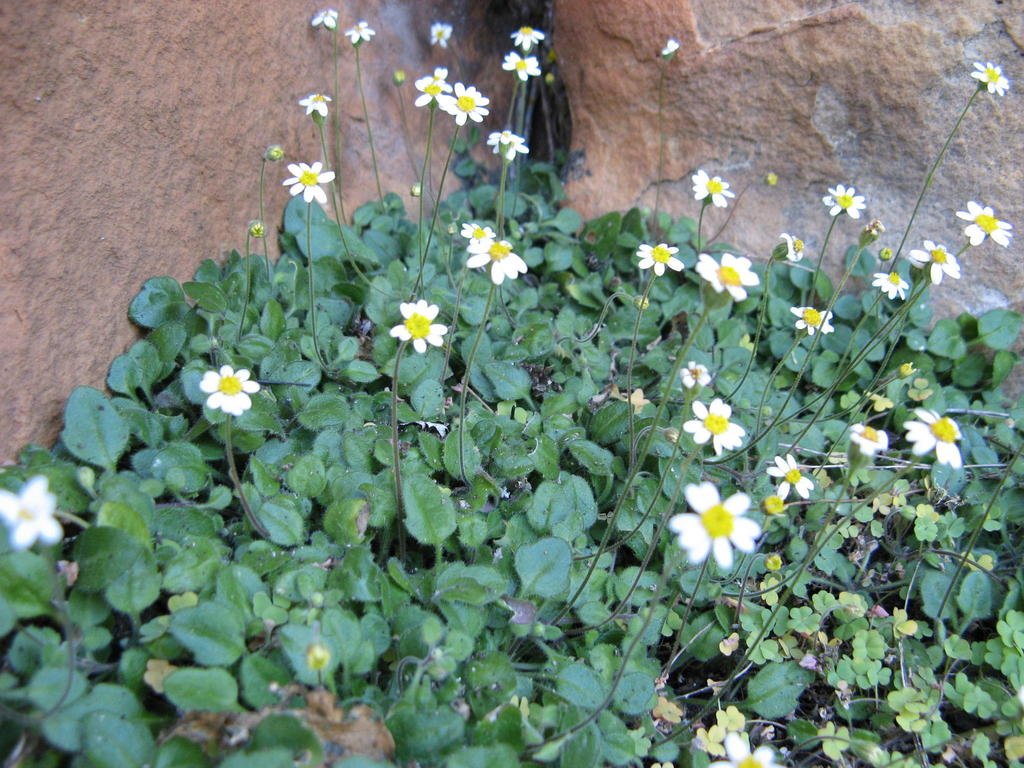

Scientific classification
- Kingdom: Plantae
- Clade: Tracheophytes
- Clade: Angiosperms
- Clade: Eudicots
- Clade: Asterids
- Order: Asterales
- Family: Asteraceae
- Genus: Felicia
- Section: Felicia sect. Neodetris
- Species: F. cymbalariae

Binomial name
- Felicia cymbalariae (Aiton) Bolus & Wolley-Dod

Subspecies
- subsp. cymbalariae; subsp. ionops

Synonyms
- Aster cymbalariae, Munichia cymbalariae; Cineraria hirsuta, Munichia hirsuta, Aster hirsutus; Felicia brachyglossa, Munychia brachyglossa; Munichia cymbalariae β microcephala

= Felicia cymbalariae =

Perennial plant in the daisy family from South Africa

Felicia cymbalariae, is a hairy perennial herbaceous plant of up to 30 cm (12 in) high in the family Asteraceae. It has creeping branches that bend upwards, stalked leaves of up to 6 × 4½ cm (2.4 × 1.8 in) with few teeth or nearly entire. The flower heads are set individually on top of up to 8 cm (3 in) long stalks and contain about sixteen white ray florets of about 6 × 1½ mm around a center with many yellow or dark wine red disc florets. It can be found in the Western Cape province of South Africa. Flower heads can be found between September and June.

== Description ==
Felicia cymbalariae is a perennial herbaceous plant of up to 30 cm (12 in) high, with green, creeping branches that bend upwards. The branches are set with stiff hairs standing out, and most leaves are oppositely set, but the highest may be alternate. The leaves are stalked. The leaf blade is broadly egg-shaped to slightly heart-shaped, up to 6 cm (2.4 in) long and 4½ cm (1.8 in) wide, the margin with few strong, coarse teeth, or pointy lobes. It has netted veins. The surface is variably densely set with long, somewhat glandular hairs, particularly near the base.

The flower heads are set individually on the top of up to 8 cm (3 in) long stalks. The heads contain both female ray and bisexual and male disc florets (so-called heterogamous capitula). At the base of the head, surrounding and protecting the florets before opening, are three unclear whorls of sepal-like bracts or scales (or phyllaries) that together make up the involucre, which is narrowly egg-shaped, about 7 mm (0.28 in) wide. The phyllaries are unequal in size. The outer whorl consists of few phyllaries of about 2½ mm (0.1 in) wide and ½ mm (0.02 in) wide, while the inner phyllaries are in two whorls, about 4½ mm (0.18 in) long and ½–1 mm (0.02–0.04 in) wide, with rough glandular hairs or hairless, with papery margins.

Each head consists of approximately sixteen white, female ray florets encircling many yellow, bisexual disc florets. These ray florets are about 6 mm (¼ in) long and 1½ mm (0.06 in) wide, with glandular hears on the tube shaped base. The disc florets are about 4 mm (0.16 in) long and also have a glandular tube. Within the ray florets are five anthers merged into a tube through which the style grows while gathering the pollen on its shaft. Each anther is topped by a triangular extension. The pappus consists of many white bristles of about 3 mm (0.12 in) long standing out at an angle and set with protruding teeth from the base to the top. The dry, one-seeded, indehiscent fruits called cypselae are narrowly inverted egg-shaped in outline, about 2½ mm (0.1 in) and 1 mm (0.04 in) wide are dark brown in colour with two light ribs along the edge, are set with broad, very short hairs of 0.1 mm (0.004 in) long, and the surface without further sculpture or few scales.

=== Differences between the subspecies ===
The typical subspecies has leaves of about 6 x 4½ cm with few strong teeth, and yellow disc florets. Subspecies ionops has leaves of 2½ cm long with weak teeth, and disc florets that are dark wine red in the upper parts.

== Taxonomy ==
The first name that was given to what probably is this species, is Aster oppositifolius, in volume 6 of the Amoenitates Academicae by Carl Linnaeus in 1763; but it lacks a description, rendering it invalid. This name was later associated with Felicia amelloides. It was first described by William Aiton in his Hortus Kewensis of 1789 and he named it Aster cymbalariae. Nees von Esenbeck reassigned it in 1833, calling it Munichia cymbalariae. Étienne Pierre Ventenat described Cineraria hirsuta in 1803, and this was reassigned in 1836 by Augustin Pyramus de Candolle as Munichia hirsuta, and in 1865 by William Henry Harvey as Aster hirsutus, who also recognised A. cymbalariae with vars. cymbalariae and ionops. In 1822, Henri Cassini described Felicia brachyglossa, which was reassigned by himself in 1825, creating the name Munychia brachyglossa. In 1836, De Candole had distinguished Munichia cymbalariae β microcephala. Harry Bolus and Anthony Hurt Wolley-Dod made the correct combination Felica cymbalariae in 1950. In 1973, Jürke Grau considered these names synonymous, agreed with Harvey's variety, but raised it to subspecies level, and so created Felicia cymbalariae subsp. ionops. The species is considered to be part of the section Neodetris.

== Distribution ==
The subspecies ionops occurs with some overlap, generally more easterly, between the mountains around Clanwilliam in the north, via Worcester to Jonkershoek in the southeast and the Cape Peninsula in the southwest, with the Piketberg the northwestern corner of its distribution. The subspecies ionops occurs with some overlap, generally more easterly, between Clanwilliam in the north to Caledon in the south.

== Conservation ==
Both subspecies of Felicia cymbalariae have a stable population and their continued survival is considered to be of least concern.
