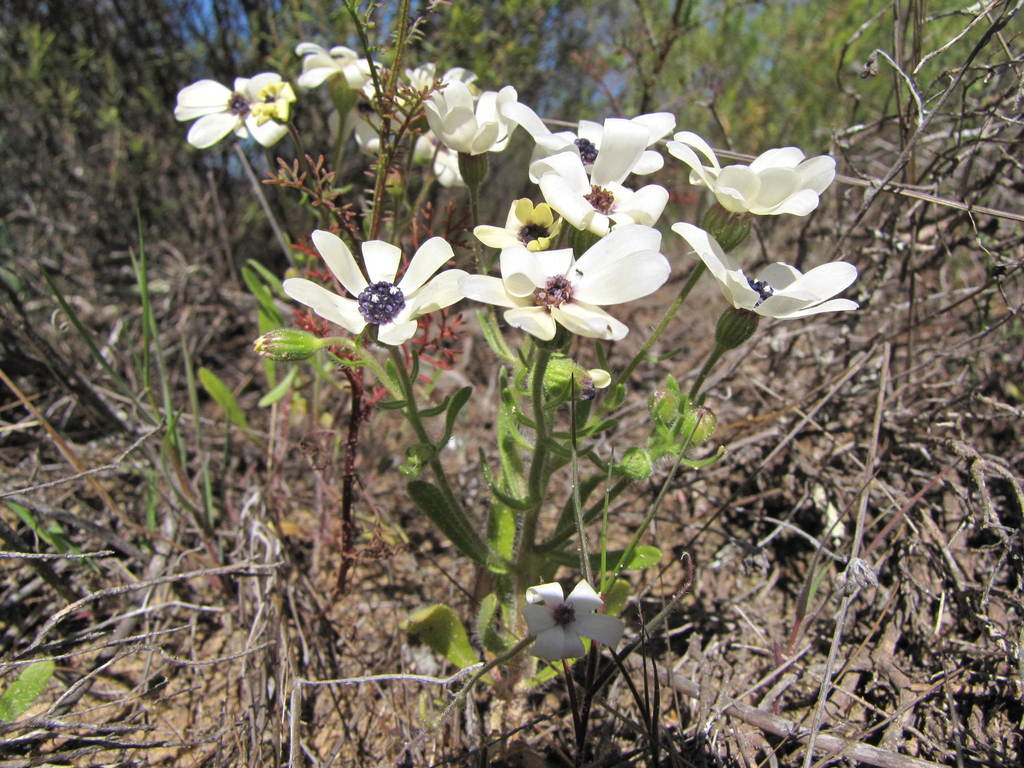

Scientific classification
- Kingdom: Plantae
- Clade: Tracheophytes
- Clade: Angiosperms
- Clade: Eudicots
- Clade: Asterids
- Order: Asterales
- Family: Asteraceae
- Genus: Felicia
- Section: Felicia sect. Neodetris
- Species: F. josephinae

Binomial name
- Felicia josephinae J.C.Manning & Goldblatt

= Felicia josephinae =

Annual plant in the daisy family from South Africa

Felicia josephinae is a species of flowering plant in the family Asteraceae. It is a roughly hairy annual herbaceous plant of 15–20 cm (6–8 in) high. It branches near its base, and has few leaves along its stems. The lower leaves are set oppositely, inverted lance-shaped, relatively large at 3–7 cm (1.2–2.8 in) long and 0.7–1.3 cm (0.3–0.5 in) wide, and soon withering, while the higher ones are smaller and relatively narrower. In the axils of the leaves grow flower heads of 7–8 mm (about 1/3 in) wide on stalks of up to 5 cm (2.0 in) long, topped with an involucre of about 5 mm (0.20 in) high and 4 mm (0.16 in) wide, consisting of eleven to thirteen bracts in two rows with bristles near the tip, eight to nine white or cream-coloured ligulate florets surrounding fourteen or fifteen deep purple disc florets. Flowers can be found in September and October. The species is an endemic species that can only be found in a small area along the west coast of the Western Cape province of South Africa.

== Description ==
Felicia josephinae is an annual herbaceous plant (germinating, flowering and setting seed just one time, before dying, all within one year) of 15–20 cm (6–8 in) high that branches regularly from near its base upward. The stems and leaves are prickly due to short and long hairs that each consist of several cells, mixed with glands on short stalks in the upper parts of the stems. The lower leaves are set oppositely, are inverted lance-shaped, relatively large at 3–7 cm (1.2–2.8 in) long and 0.7–1.3 cm (0.28–0.51 in) wide, have few prickly hairs and soon wither. The higher leaves are narrower, lance- to line-shaped, mostly alternately set, and prickly due to long and short hairs.

The flower heads are set individually at the end of flower stalks of up to 5 cm (2.0 in) long, that stand in the axils of the leaves and carry few, scattered and very small awl-shaped bracts. The heads contain both female ray and bisexual and male disc florets (so-called heterogamous capitula). At the base of the head, surrounding and protecting the florets before opening, are two whorls of sepal-like bracts or scales (or phyllaries) that together make up the involucre, which is narrowly egg-shaped, about 5 mm (0.20 in) high and 4 mm (0.16 in) wide, consisting of eleven to thirteen bracts in two rows with bristles near the tip. The phyllaries are 4–5 mm (0.16–0.20 in) long, with papery margins and a row of hairs near the tip. The outer whorl of phyllaries are line-shaped, about 1 mm (0.039 in) wide with narrow papery margins, while the inner phyllaries are inverted lance-shaped, about 1.5 mm (0.06 in) wide, having broad margins. The communal base (or receptacle) on which the individual florets are implanted is flat, deeply pitted, and lacks receptacular bracts (or palea) at the foot of the florets. The eight or nine white or cream-coloured ray florets surrounding the disc are female only, have a cylindrical tube of 2.5–3 mm (0.10–0.12 in) long with some glandular hairs, at the top changing into a spreading, elliptic or inverted lance-shaped blade of 10–12 mm (0.39–0.47 in) long and 4–6 mm (0.16–0.24 in) wide with four veins running along its length.

At the base of each ray floret is a narrowly elliptic ovary with hairs pressed to its surface. From it rises a style that is circular in cross-section, ending in two pointy, line-shaped branches of about 1 mm (0.039 in) long, its outer margins functioning as stigma. There is no pappus. The one-seeded, indehiscent, dry fruit (called cypsela) is flattened oval in shape, 2.5–3 mm (0.10–0.12 in) long and about 1.5 mm (0.06 in) in diameter, with thickened margins, its surfaces and margins being covered with pale brown hairs pressed against its surface. The fourteen or fifteen deep purple disc florets are bisexual, but those in the center of the head do not develop seed. The tube has glandular hairs, is cylinder-shaped, 2.5–3 mm long, widening a bit towards the upper end, where it splits into five back-curving triangular lobes of about 1 mm long and ¾ mm wide at its base, with thickened margins. Like in all Asteraceae, the five anthers have merged into a hollow tube through which the style grows with the floret opens, while gathering the pollen on its shaft. The anthers produce cream-coloured pollen, are themselves deep blue, about 2 mm long, including the oval, slightly keeled appendage at the top, while the base is blunt without an appendage. The ovary under the tube florets are narrowly elliptic, also with hairs pressed against its surface. It is topped by a purple style that is circular in cross-section, ending in two pointy, recurved, flattened, line-shaped branches of about 1 mm (0.039 in) long, its outer margins functioning as stigma. In the central florets the style ends in triangular grainy branches. The pappus on each of the cypselas of the tube florets consists of one row of about 25 spreading, short, stiff, hooked bristles of 3–4 mm (0.12–0.16 in) long but feathery near middle, and merged at their base, forming a short, white collar. The cypselas are identical to those of the ray florets.

=== Differences with related species ===
Most Felicia species have a yellow disc, and blue, purple or pink, rarely white or yellow ray florets. F. josephinae, F. heterophylla and a form of F. amoena subsp. latifolia have deep purple disc florets. From these two taxa, F. josephinae differs by its broad creamy ray florets, which are more narrow and purple in F. heterophylla and narrower and blue in F. amoena subsp. latifolia.

== Taxonomy ==
As far as known, Felicia josephinae was first collected, between Clanwilliam and Elands Bay, in September 1933, by poet, medical doctor and plant hunter C. Louis Leipoldt. Further specimens were collected from a small stretch along the coast between Elands Bay and Lambert's Bay. These finds were either considered a new, unnamed species or, tentatively as some variation of Chareis heterophylla (currently Felicia heterophylla), with which it shares the deep purple colour of the disc florets, but from which it differs in having whitish ligulate florets instead of medium bluish purple. Somehow Jürke Grau, who revised the genus Felicia in 1973, hasn't come across any of the collections of this species. It was described by John Charles Manning and Peter Goldblatt only in 2002, who named it after South African botanist and Asteraceae specialist Josephine Beyers. Synonyms have not been recorded. F. josephinae has been assigned to the section Neodetris.

== Distribution, habitat and ecology ==
Felicia josephinae only occurs in a small area on the west coast of the Western Cape province of South Africa between Lambert's Bay in the north, Elands Bay in the south, and the Sandberg, east of Leipoldtville. It grows on dunes and hills in a vegetation type called Strandveld Succulent Karoo, which occurs on chalky sands in the coastal plain, dominated by sparse shrubs, in particular Salvia lanceolata, skilpadbessie bos Muraltia spinosa, and several succulent Euphorbia species. Many annuals appear seasonally between the shrubs in the open spaces, including many Scrophulariaceae such as Alonsoa unilabiata, Hemimeris racemosa, Lyperia tristis, Nemesia affinis and N. bicomis, and the daisies Arctotis hirsuta, Dimorphotheca pluvialis and Trichogyne verticillata. F. josephinae is restricted to the very southern part of the Strandveld Succulent Karoo, with shallow sands overlying more compact sandstone-derived substrates. This species grows in an area in which the rains fall almost exclusively during the winter. The seeds germinate at the start of the rains in the autumn and are ready to flower in spring.

== Conservation ==
Felicia josephinae is known from eight locations and considered a vulnerable species because of its declining population, which is seriously threatened by loss of habitat due to ongoing expansion of rooibos and potato cultivation and overgrazing.
