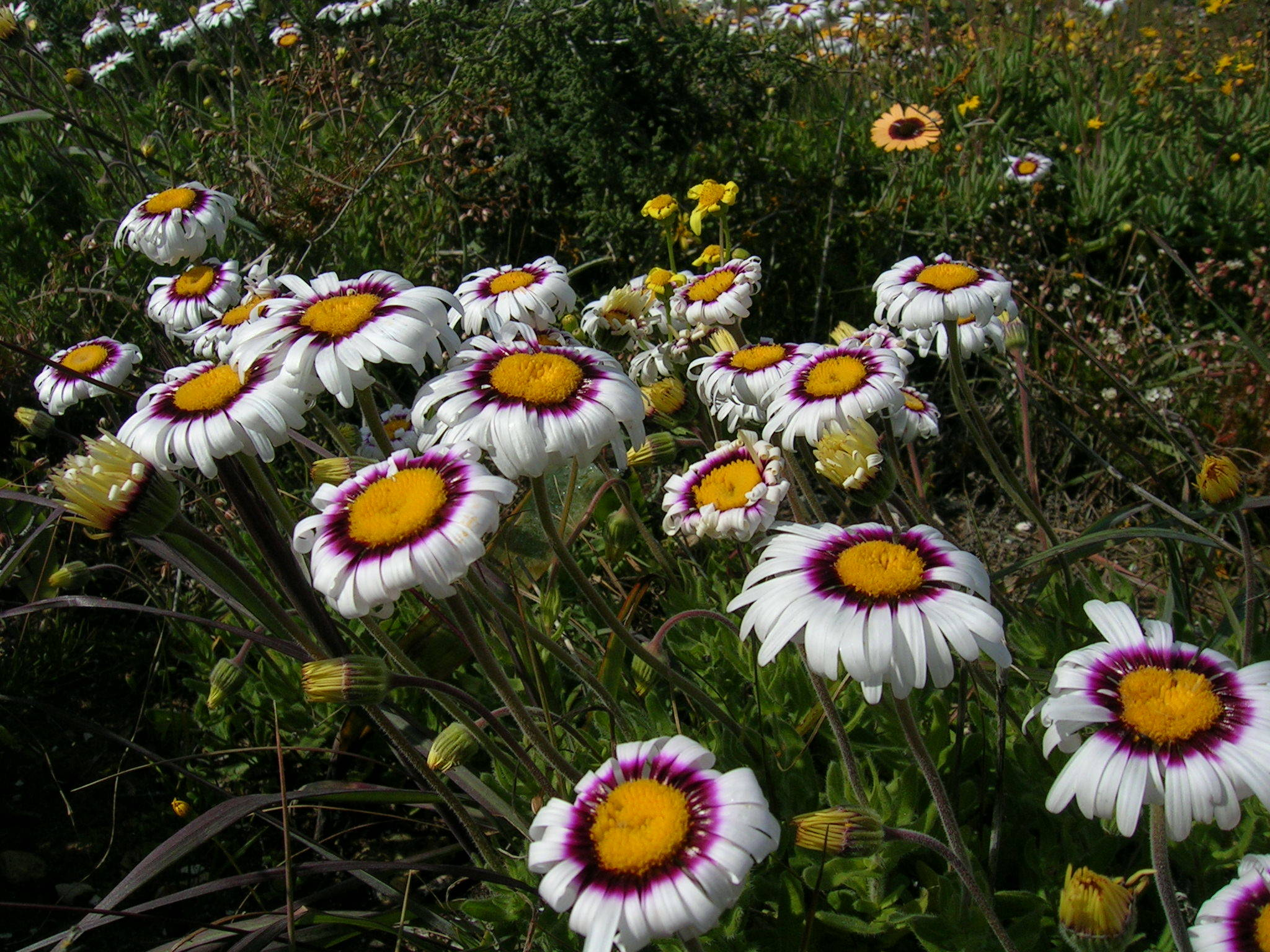

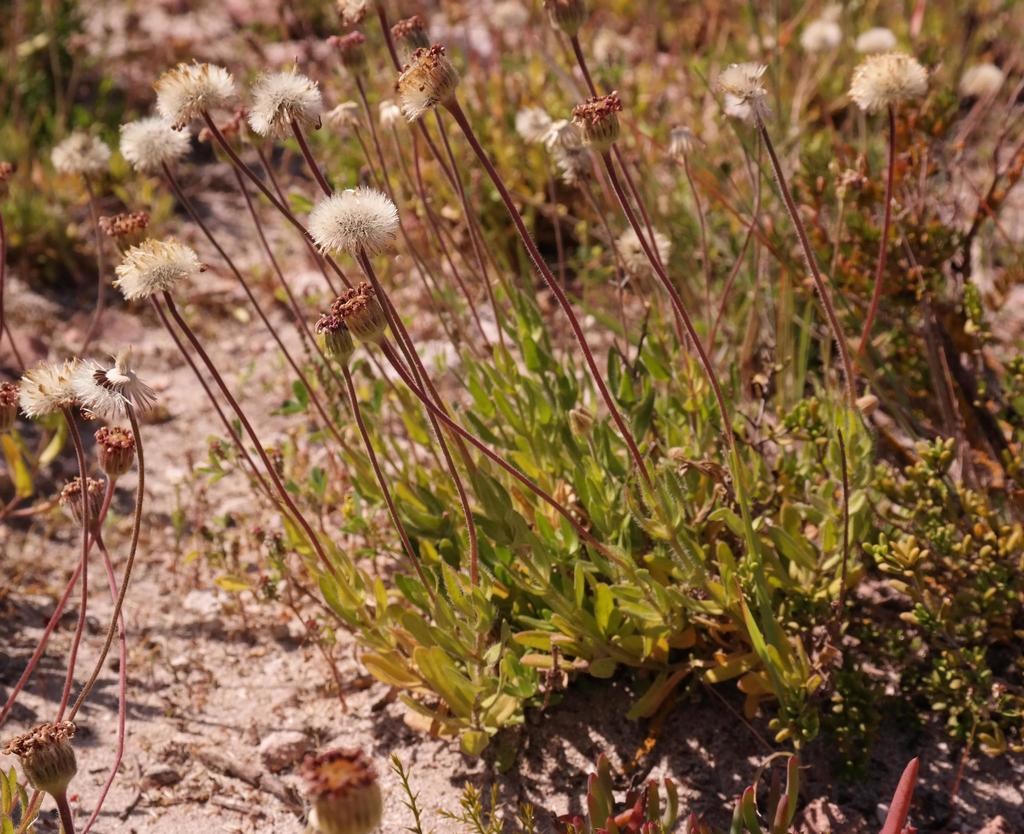

Scientific classification
- Kingdom: Plantae
- Clade: Tracheophytes
- Clade: Angiosperms
- Clade: Eudicots
- Clade: Asterids
- Order: Asterales
- Family: Asteraceae
- Genus: Felicia
- Section: Felicia sect. Neodetris
- Species: F. elongata

Binomial name
- Felicia elongata (Thunb.) O.Hoffm.

Synonyms
- Aster elongatus, Agathaea elongata, Felicia elongata (Thunb.) Bolus & Wolley-Dod; Aster elongatus var. thunbergii; Agathaea tricolor, Aster tricolor

= Felicia elongata =

Perennial plant in the daisy family from South Africa

Felicia elongata is a perennial plant of up to 40 cm (1 1/3 ft) high that is assigned to the family Asteraceae. It has stiff, oval, opposing leaves with one distinctive vein and entire margin. The 5 cm (2 in) wide flower heads are very conspicuous in colour, white with a dark purple zone at the base of the ray florets and an orange-yellow disc. Flowering occurs from late August to September, or if the rains arrive late, sometimes October. It is a rare species that is restricted to the Saldanha Bay area. It is sometimes called Saldanha felicia or tricolour felicia in English, and driekleurblommetjie in Afrikaans.

== Description ==
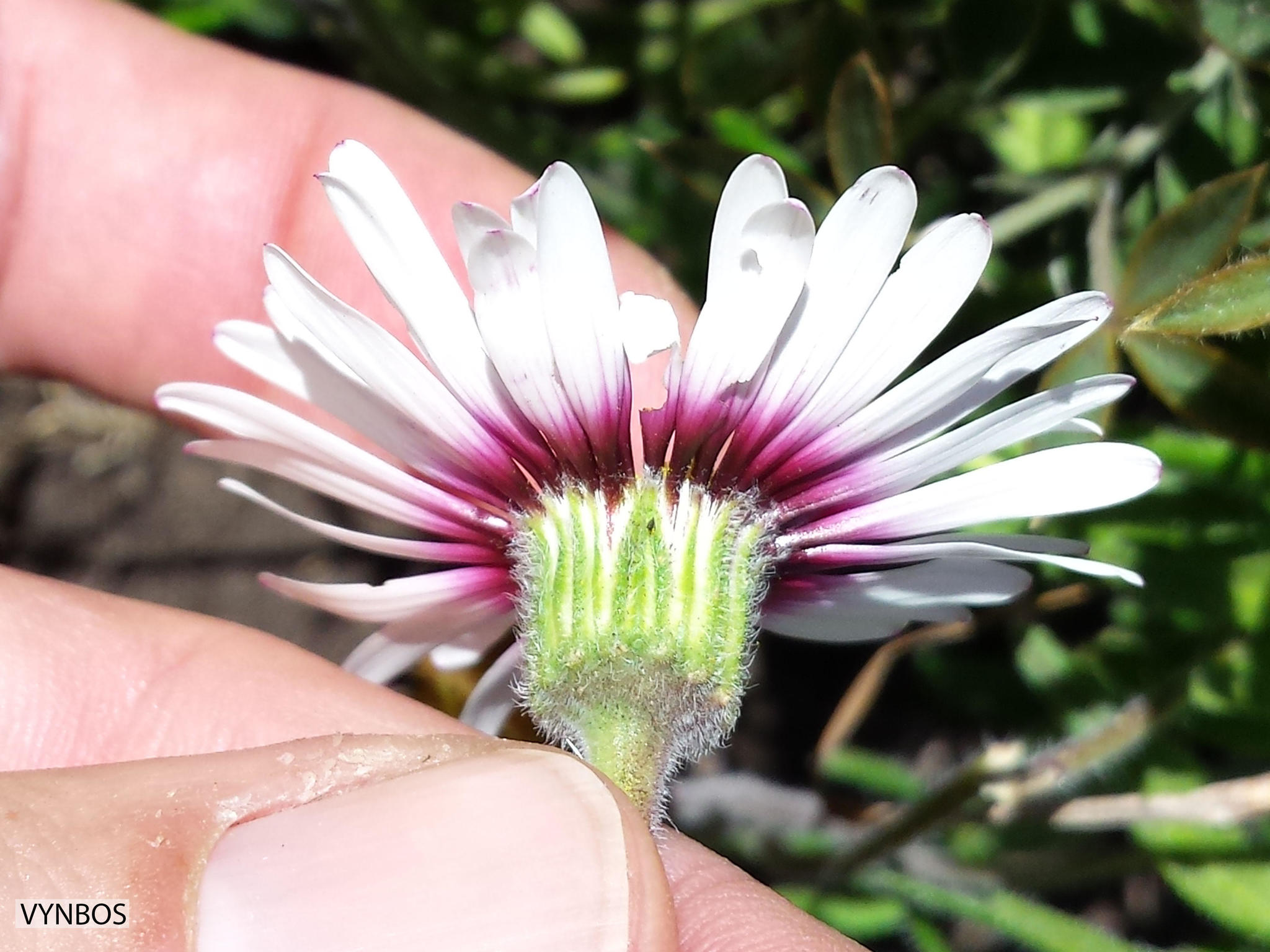
The involucre

Felicia elongata is an upright perennial herbaceous plant with a woody base, of up to about 40 cm (1 1/3 ft) high. Its leaves are oppositely arranged along the stem, oval in outline and rigid, 3–4 cm (1 1/5–1 3/5 in) long and 8–10 mm (0.31–0.39 in) wide, with one central vein, rarely two additional veins can be seen. The margin of the leaf is curled downwards, densely roughly hairy on upper side, while the lower surface may lose some of its hairs over time, and is gray-green in colour.

The flower heads are about 5 cm (2 in) across and sit individually on top of about 15 cm (rarely to 20 cm) long, dense velvety hairy stalks. The involucre is almost 2 cm (4/5 in) in diameter, and consist of two strict rows of bracts of about 8 mm (0.31 in) long, more or less fringed at the tip. The outer bracts are narrowly lance-shaped, and 0.8 mm (0.031 in) wide, the inner bracts are lance-shaped and about 1 mm (0.039 in) wide, one-ribbed, losing its hair with time. The numerous female ray florets have a milky white, rarely magenta strap of about 17 mm (2/3 in) long and 3 1/2 mm wide, near the base with a dark purple zone. Many bisexual, disc florets with an orange-yellow corolla of about 6 mm (1/4 in) long. In the center of each corolla are five anthers merged into a tube, through which the style grows when the floret opens, hoovering up the pollen on its shaft. Around the base of the corolla are many white pappus bristles of about 6 mm (1/4 in) long. The dark brown, dry, one-seeded, indehiscent fruits called cypselae are ellips- to inverted egg-shaped, about 3 mm (0.12 in) long and 1.2 mm (0.047 in) wide, with a marginal ridge, while the surface has some weak scales and is evenly covered in 0.2 mm (0.0079 in) long hairs.

Felicia elongata is a diploid having eight sets of homologue chromosomes (2n=16).

== Taxonomy ==
The Saldanha felicia was first described by Carl Thunberg in the year 1800, in the second volume of his book Prodromus Plantarum Capensium, based on a specimen he collected himself in 1772 during his three-year stay in the Cape Colony, and he named it Aster elongatus. In 1833, Nees von Esenbeck thought that it should be moved to another genus and he made the combination Agathaea elongata. Aster elongatus var. thunbergii was distinguished by William Henry Harvey in 1865. Karl August Otto Hoffmann reassigned Thunberg's species and made the combination Felicia namaquana in 1905. Harry Bolus and Anthony Hurt Wolley-Dod were not aware of Hoffmann's combination and claimed it for themselves in 1950. In 1973 Jürke Grau considered all of these name synonymous. The species is considered to be part of the section Neodetris. Aster elongatus var. candollei described by William Henry Harvey in 1865 however, has now been assigned to Felicia namaquana.

== Distribution, habitat and ecology ==
The Saldanha felica can only be found growing on limestone ridges and coastal sands, alongside the Langebaan Lagoon, and edging the Vredenburg Peninsula to Paternoster in the north. The flower heads appear to be mainly pollinated by bees. Within one month of opening, the flower heads develop into seedheads. It may grow in the vicinity of the Cape daisy, Dimorphotheca pluvialis, blue flax, Heliophila coronopifolia or in the shade of rooi malva, Pelargonium fulgidum or dikbeen malva, P. gibbosum. After flowering and setting seed, the plants die back and survive the long hot summer as short, leafless woody stumps. These start growing as soon as the winter rains arrive. It occurs in vegetation types called Langebaan Dune Strandveld, Saldanha Flats Strandveld, Saldanha Granite Strandveld and Saldanha Limestone Strandveld.

== Conservation ==
Felicia elongata is considered a vulnerable species, because the total population comprises less than 2000 mature individuals, divided over eight subpopulations, and is in decline due to recreational developments.

== Use ==
Felicia elongata is sometimes cultivated as an ornamental and is can be grown quite easily. It grows very well in well-draining garden soil.
