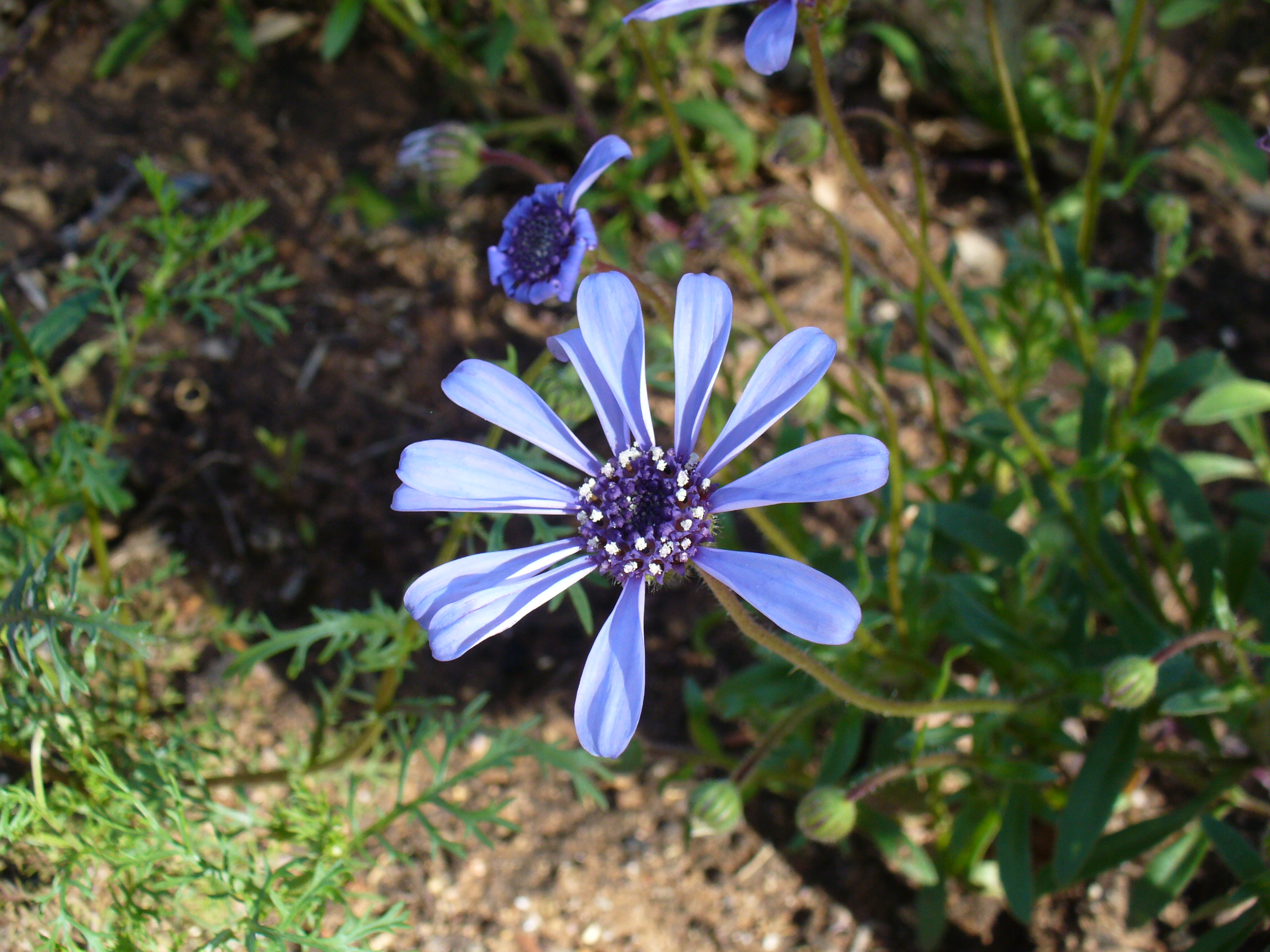

Scientific classification
- Kingdom: Plantae
- Clade: Tracheophytes
- Clade: Angiosperms
- Clade: Eudicots
- Clade: Asterids
- Order: Asterales
- Family: Asteraceae
- Genus: Felicia
- Section: Felicia sect. Neodetris
- Species: F. heterophylla

Binomial name
- Felicia heterophylla (Cass.) Grau

Synonyms
- Charieis heterophylla; Kaulfussia amelloides, Charieis neesii; Charieis caerulea

= Felicia heterophylla =

Perennial plant in the daisy family from South Africa

Felicia heterophylla is a roughly hairy annual plant in the family Asteraceae. It has alternate leaves of 1–5 cm long with an entire margin or few inconspicuous teeth. The flower heads are set individually at the tip of its stems, and contain a whorl of purplish blue ray florets around a center of blackish blue disk florets. Flower heads appear in winter and spring. It is called true-blue daisy in English and bloublomastertjie in Afrikaans. It is an endemic species that only occurs in the Western Cape province of South Africa.

== Description ==
Felicia heterophylla is an annual herbaceous plant of up to 35 cm (12 in) high that branches richly particularly near its base. The leaves are set oppositely, are inverted lance-shaped, 1–5 cm (0.4–2.0 in) long and about ½ cm (0.2 in) wide, narrowed at its foot in a winged stalk, entire or with a few weak teeth, with a row of hairs along the margin and the surfaces bristly hairy. Leave have one main veins, or two additional inconspicuous veins to the sides.

The flower heads are set individually at the end of grooved, glandular hairy flower stalks of up to 15 cm (6 in) long, that stand in the axils of the leaves. The heads contain both female ray and bisexual and male disc florets (so-called heterogamous capitula). At the base of the head, surrounding and protecting the florets before opening, are two whorls of sepal-like bracts or scales (or phyllaries) that together make up the involucre of about 8 mm (0.32 in) in diameter. The phyllaries are about 7 mm (0.28 in) long, with papery margins. The outer whorl of phyllaries are lance-shaped, about 1½ mm (0.06 in) wide, and set with rough glandular hairs, while the inner phyllaries are narrowly inverted egg-shaped with few glandular hairs.

The approximately seven, deep blue ray florets surrounding the disc have a hairy tube, at the top changing into a spreading blade of about 15 mm (0.6 in) long and 5 mm (0.2 in) wide. The dry, one-seeded, indehiscent fruits (or cypselae) of the ray florets lack pappus. The many blackish blue, rarely brown-red and yellow, disc florets are bisexual and about 5 mm (0.20 in) long. Like in all Asteraceae, the five anthers have merged into a hollow tube through which the style grows when the floret opens, while gathering the pollen on its shaft. The anthers produce cream-coloured pollen, are themselves deep blue, and have a shortly triangular appendage at the top. The whitish pappus on each of the cypselas of the disc florets consists of many bristles of about 5 mm (0.20 in) long, with short teeth in the lower quarter but feathery further up, the side branches about 0.3 mm (0.012 in) long. The cypselas are elliptical, about 4½ mm (0.18 in) long and 2 mm (0.08 in) thick, with scaly, thickened ribs along the edge and the surface set with blunt hairs of 0.7 mm (0.028 in).

Felicia heterophylla is a diploid having five sets of homologue chromosomes (2n=10).

=== Differences with related species ===
Most Felicia species have a yellow disc, and blue, purple or pink, rarely white or yellow ray florets, and many are perennials or shrublets. F. heterophylla, F. josephinae and a form of F. amoena subsp. latifolia are annuals and the only taxa with blackish blue disc florets. F. amoena subsp. latifolia has about twenty five ray florets, while F. heterophylla has about seven, but up to thirteen. F. josephinae differs by its broad creamy ray florets.

== Taxonomy ==
As far as known, this species of was first described by Henri Cassini in 1817, who named it Charieis heterophylla. In 1820, Nees von Esenbeck called another specimen Kaulfussia amelloides. This specimen was reassigned in 1822 by Cassini, who named it Charieis neesii and remarked it was very close to heterophylla and might prove synonymous. In the same publication, Cassini also described Charieis caerulea, that he also considered possibly synonymous with heterophylla. In 1973, Jürke Grau agreed with Cassini that these three names were indeed synonyms and included them in the genus Felicia, making the new combination F. heterophylla for them. The species is considered to be part of the section Neodetris.

== Distribution, habitat and ecology ==
Felicia heterophylla occurs between Clanwilliam in the north and the Cape Peninsula in the south.

== Use ==
The true-blue daisy is sometimes used as an ornamental.

== Conservation ==
Felicia heterophylla has a stable population and is considered a least-concern species.
