= Coenogamete =

Gamete with more than one nucleus

A coenogamete is a multi-nucleate gamete (a gamete with more than one nucleus). Fusion of coengametes creates coenocytes.

They exist amongst members of the phylum Porifera (sponges) under kingdom Animalia and division Zygomycota of kingdom Fungi.
