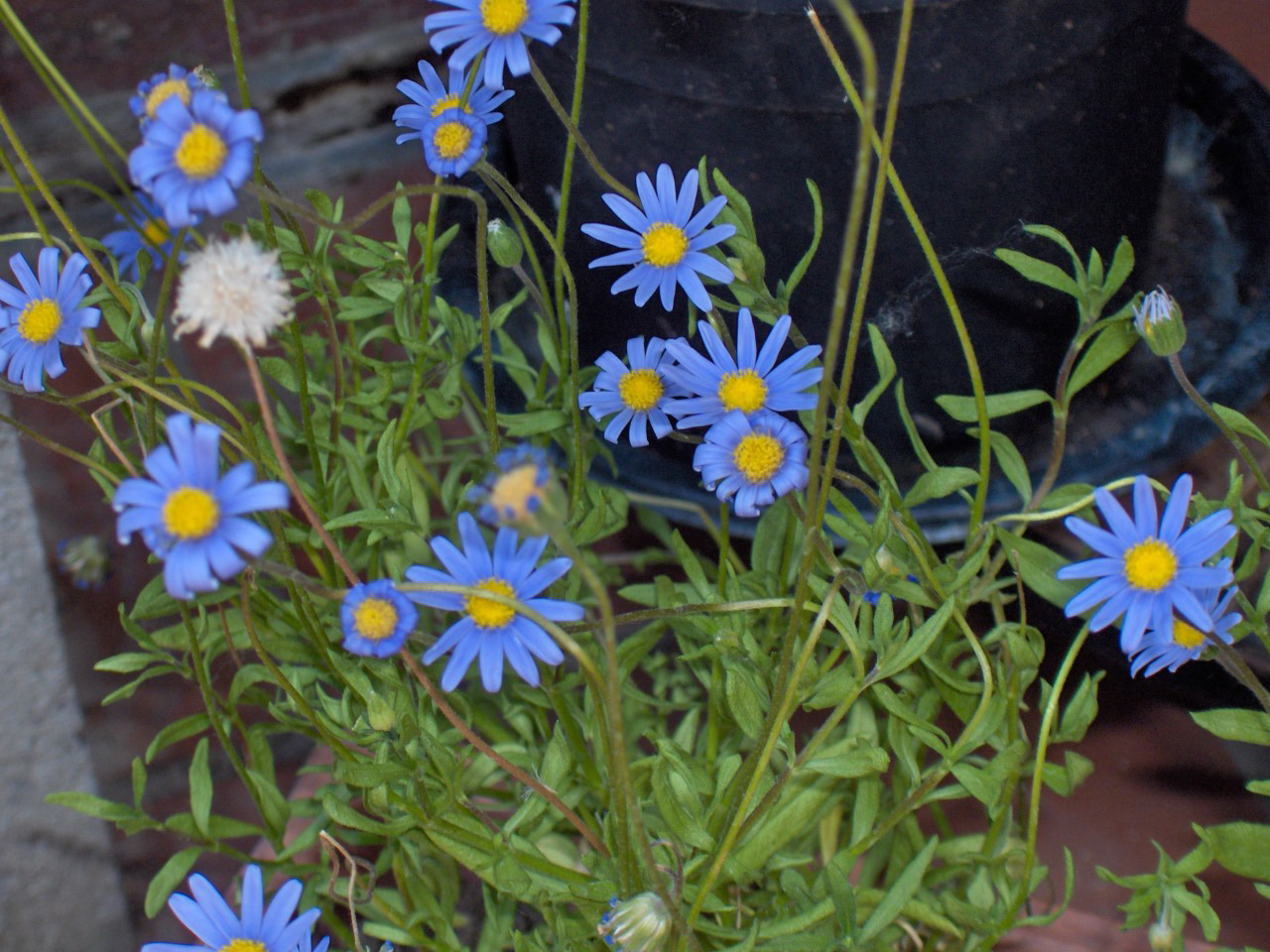

Scientific classification
- Kingdom: Plantae
- Clade: Embryophytes
- Clade: Tracheophytes
- Clade: Angiosperms
- Clade: Eudicots
- Clade: Asterids
- Order: Asterales
- Family: Asteraceae
- Genus: Felicia
- Section: Felicia sect. Neodetris
- Species: F. amelloides

Binomial name
- Felicia amelloides (L.) Voss

Synonyms
- Cineraria amelloides, Cineraria oppositifolia, Agathaea coelestris, Agathaea amelloides; Aster rotundifolius, Agathaea capensis, Aster capensis var. rotundifolius

= Felicia amelloides =

Plant in the daisy family from southern Africa

Felicia amelloides, the blue daisy bush, blue felicia or kingfisher daisy, is a hairy, soft, usually perennial, evergreen plant, in the family Asteraceae. It can be found along the southern coast of South Africa. It grows as groundcover, and is cultivated as an ornamental, where it was introduced in Europe in the middle of the 18th century.

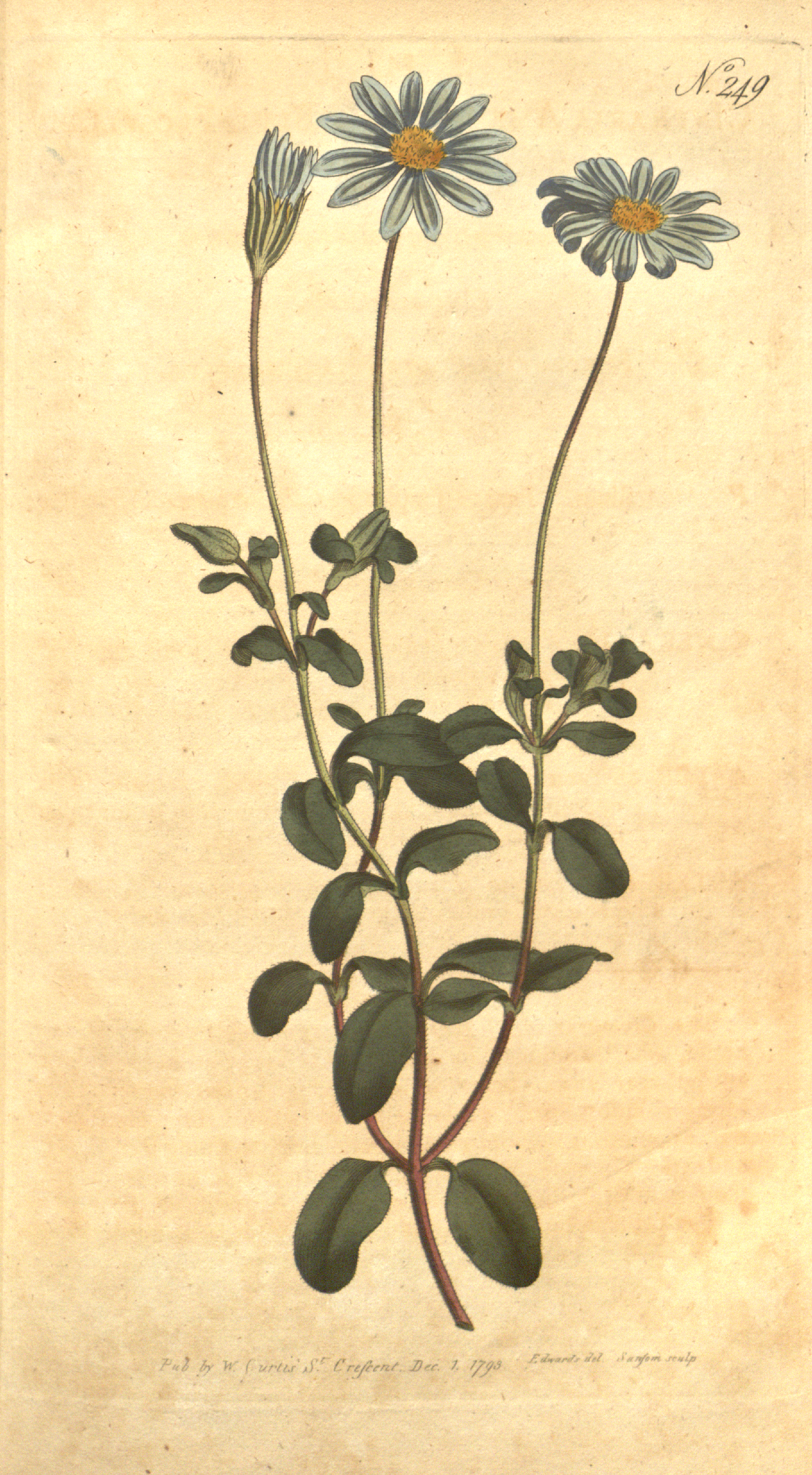
Etching from The Botanical Magazine, published in 1794

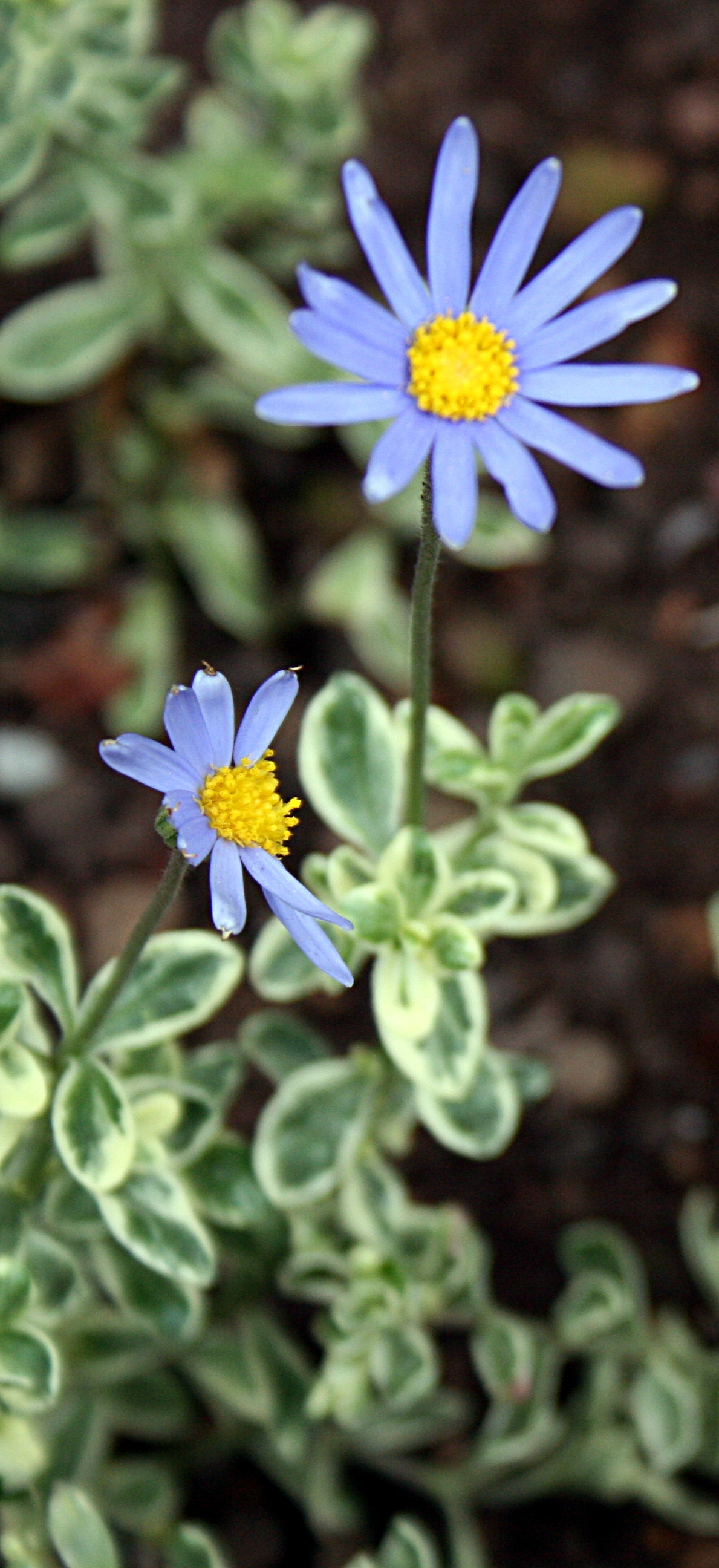
Variegated cultivar

== Description ==
Felicia amelloides is an evergreen, rich and regularly branched, upright perennial, sometimes biennial, herbaceous plant with a woody base, of about 50 cm (1.6 ft), sometimes up to 1 m high plant. All of its leaves are oppositely arranged along the stem, are usually relatively large, 2–5 1/2 cm (3/4–2 in) long and 1–2 1/2 cm (0.4–1.0 in) wide, but strongly varying in size. They are elliptic to inverted egg-shaped, with a blunt or indistinctly pointy tip, an entire margin, and the leaves near the ground may have a short stalk. The leaves are stiff and leathery and feel sandpapery, due to a covering of short bristle-like hairs. Each leaf has one to three conspicuous veins, its margins are curled downwards. The upper surface is dark green, but the underside is lighter.

=== Inflorescences ===
The flower heads are about 3 cm (1 1/5 in) across and sit individually on top of green to dark reddish, about 18 cm (7 in) long, densely hairy stalks. The involucre is 5–7 mm (0.20–0.28 in) in diameter, and consist of two strict rows of bracts of 8–11 mm (0.31–0.43 in) long. The outer bracts are 1–2 mm (0.039–0.079 in) wide, narrowly inverted lance-shaped with rough and sometimes also glandular hairs. The inner bracts are 2–3 mm (0.079–0.118 in) wide, inverted lance-shaped, with dry papery edges. The approximately twelve, bright blue, female ray florets have a strap of about 17 mm (0.67 in) long and 4 mm (0.16 in) wide. These surround many bisexual, disc florets with a yellow corolla of about 4 mm (0.16 in) long.

In the center of each corolla are five anthers merged into a tube, through which the style grows when the floret opens, hoovering up the pollen on its shaft. At the tip of both style branches is a triangular appendage. Around the base of the corolla are many white, toothed, persistent pappus bristles of about 4 mm (0.16 in) long, which become slightly wider towards the top. The eventually dark brown, dry, one-seeded, indehiscent fruits called cypselae are inverted egg-shaped, about 4 mm (0.16 in) long and 2 mm (0.079 in) wide, the surface slightly scaly, and covered with short hairs.

Felicia amelloides is a diploid having nine sets of homologue chromosomes (2n=18).

=== Differences with related species ===
The blue daisy can be distinguished from other Felicia species by the fact that all its leaves are opposite, with an entire margin, the plants have a very regular branching, and the involucral bracts are very long. Other Felicia species with only opposite leaves are F. denticulata, F. cymbalariae (toothed leaves), F. joubertinae (small and narrow leaves) and F. flaneganii (small, obovate, petioled leaves).

== Taxonomy and naming ==
The blue daisy was first described by Carl Linnaeus in the second edition of his Species Plantarum, published in 1763, and he named it Cineraria amelloides. Conrad Moench gave it the name Cineraria oppositifolia in 1794, Henri Cassini called it Agathaea coelestris in 1815, while Augustin Pyramus de Candolle reassigned Linnaeus’ name, creating Agathaea amelloides in 1836. Finally, Linnaeus’ specimen was moved by Andreas Voss, who so created Felicia amelloides, the currently recognised name. Meanwhile, Carl Thunberg had collected another specimen which he named Aster rotundifolius in 1800. In 1833 Nees van Esenbeck reassigned Thunberg's plant and created Agathaea capensis. William Henry Harvey Aster capensis var. rotundifolius in 1865. In his 1973 Revision of the genus Felicia (Asteraceae), Jürke Grau regarded all of these name synonymous. The species is the Type species of the section Neodetris.

Aster capensis is a synonym for Felicia aethiopica, not of F. amelloides.

The species epithet amelloides means "like Amellus", which is a similar genus that also occurs in South Africa. Felicia amelloides has several common names including blue felicia, bush felicia, blue felicia bush, blue daisy bush, shrubby felicia, Paris daisy, and blue marguerite in English and bloumagriet or blou-astertjie in Afrikaans. The use of these names is not necessarily restricted to F. amelloides though.

== Distribution, habitat and ecology ==
The blue daisy can be found in a strip along the south coast of the Western Cape and Eastern Cape provinces of South Africa, from De Hoop Nature Reserve in the west to the mouth of the Kei River in the east. It extends furthest inland in the Eastern Cape at the Vanstadensberg near Port Elizabeth, the Groot Winterhoek Mountains near Uitenhage, and the Ecca Pass, on the road between Grahamstown and Fort Beaufort. The species is particularly common between Humansdorp and Port Alfred. The species does not occur on the Cape Peninsula, where it has been confused with Felicia aethiopica, with similar flower heads but alternately set leaves above the base.

The blue daisy is most common on old stabilizing sand dunes, or where shelter is provided, but also occurs on sandy flats, gravelly slopes, stony hillsides, rock slabs and Table Mountain Sandstone outcrops, at 0–1,000 m (0–3,281 ft) altitude.

== Conservation ==
The continued survival of Felicia amelloides is considered to be of least concern because its population is stable.

== Use ==
Felicia amelloides is used as an ornamental, both in South Africa and elsewhere. It was introduced to Europe during the eighteenth century and was one of the earliest species in horticulture. It survives some frost provided the soil is well draining, but dislikes moist heat. In hot climates, flowering ceases during summer. In colder climates, it is often treated as an annual, is sheltered in greenhouses or grown as a house plant.
