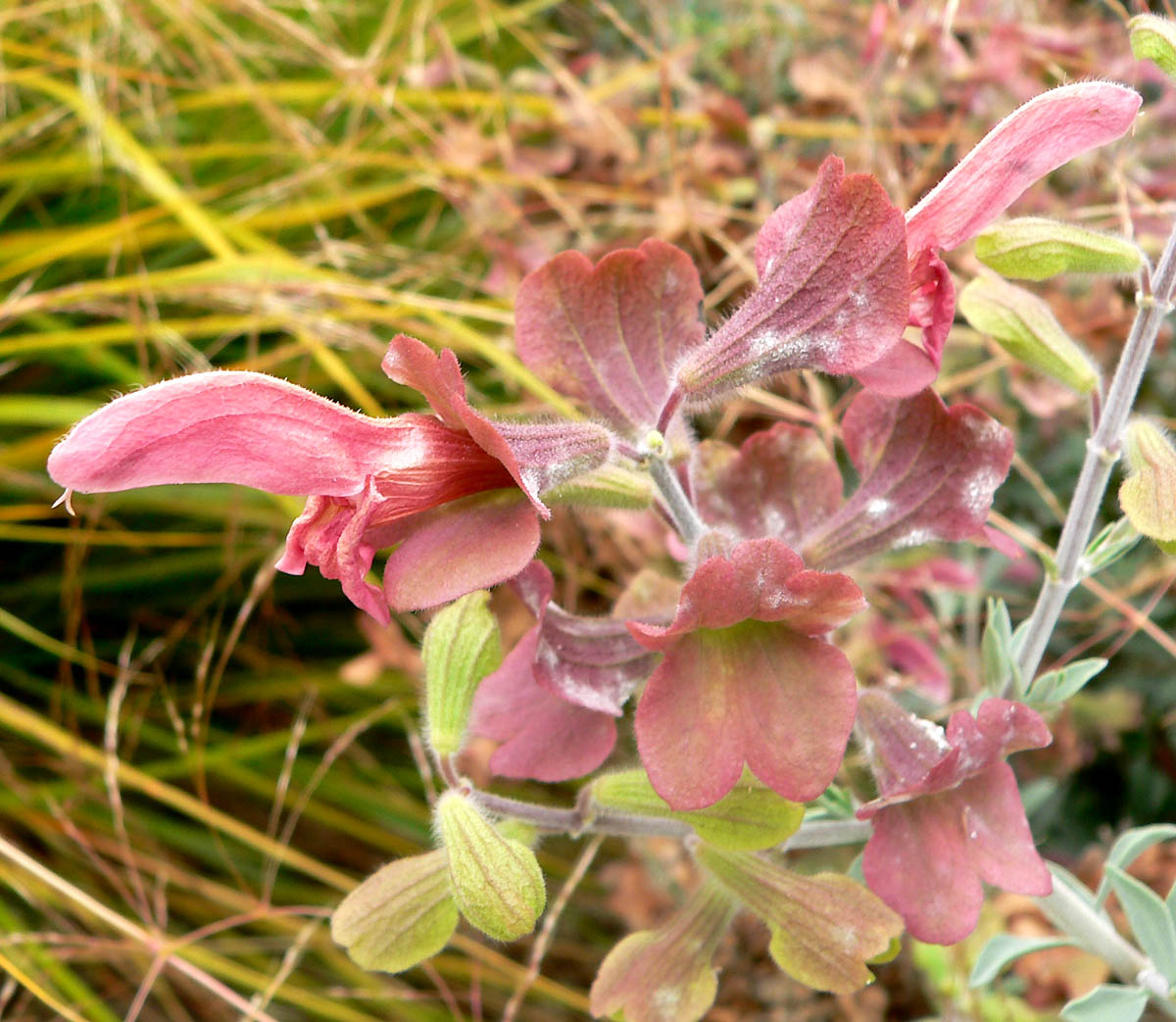

Conservation status
- Least Concern (SANBI Red List)

Scientific classification
- Kingdom: Plantae
- Clade: Tracheophytes
- Clade: Angiosperms
- Clade: Eudicots
- Clade: Asterids
- Order: Lamiales
- Family: Lamiaceae
- Genus: Salvia
- Species: S. lanceolata

Binomial name
- Salvia lanceolata Lam.

= Salvia lanceolata =

Species of shrub

Salvia lanceolata (lanceleaf sage) is a perennial shrub native to a small area of coast on the Cape of Good Hope in South Africa. It is typically found growing in sandy ground at sea level, and on dry hills and flat ground up to 1000 feet elevation. Jean-Baptiste Lamarck, a pioneer in evolutionary theory, first described and named the plant "lanceolata" in 1791. Swedish botanist Carl Peter Thunberg, who was delayed in South Africa on the way to Japan, first collected it nearly twenty years earlier, along with approximately 3,000 plants that he later described. It wasn't until 1800 that Thunberg gave the plant the specific epithet "nivea", meaning 'snowy' in Latin, referring to the color of the foliage. Because of the rules of nomenclature, Lamarck's name had precedence because he was the first to name it.

Salvia lanceolata is a much branched shrub growing 3 ft tall and 2–4 ft wide, with stems that become woody and light tan as they age. The leaves are lanceolate and evergreen, thick textured, and dove-gray with a green undertone. The .5 inch long calyx expands to 1 inch after the flowers are fertilized, turning pink. The 1.5 inch flowers are an unusual dull rosy brownish color. The plant blooms sparsely over a long period, from May through November.

When crushed, the leaves give off a light fragrance reminiscent of lemon pepper, and are used in South Africa for cooking, most commonly with fish.
