= Wolley-Dod =

Wolley-Dod is a British surname. Notable people with the surname include:

- Anthony Hurt Wolley-Dod (1861–1948), British botanist
- Charles Wolley-Dod (1892–1937), British aviator, nephew of Anthony Hurt Wolley-Dod
