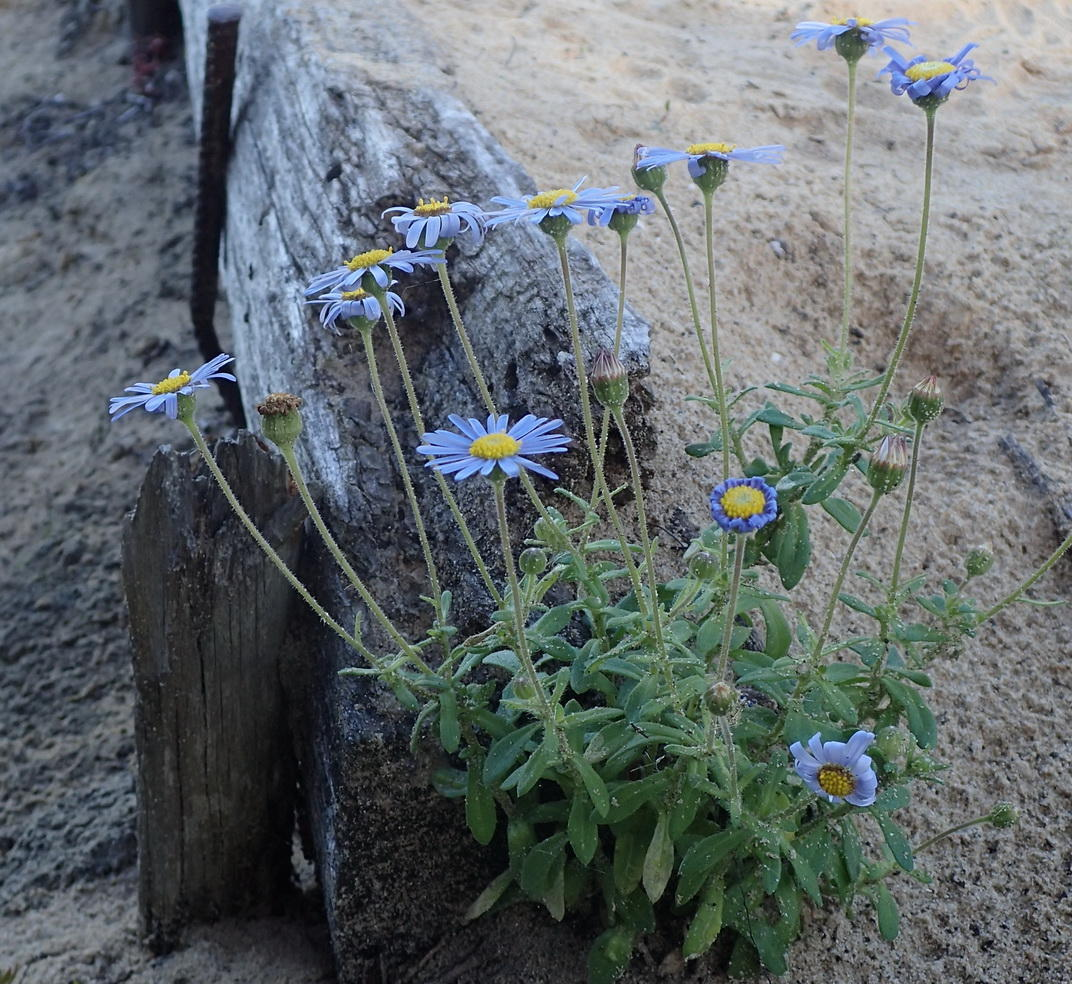
- Felicia amoena subsp. latifolia

Scientific classification
- Kingdom: Plantae
- Clade: Tracheophytes
- Clade: Angiosperms
- Clade: Eudicots
- Clade: Asterids
- Order: Asterales
- Family: Asteraceae
- Genus: Felicia
- Section: Felicia sect. Neodetris
- Species: F. amoena

Binomial name
- Felicia amoena (Sch.Bip.) Levyns

Subspecies
- Felicia amoena subsp. amoena; Felicia amoena subsp. latifolia; Felicia amoena subsp. stricta

Synonyms
- Agathaea amoena, Aster amoenus; Aster pappei, Felicia pappei; Aster elongatus var. spathulaefolius

= Felicia amoena =

Soft Felicia

Plant in the daisy family from South Africa

Felicia amoena, known as the soft felicia, is a variably hairy, sometimes glandular, biennial or perennial plant, of about 25 cm (10 in) high, that is assigned to the family Asteraceae. It is somewhat woody at its base, roots at the nodes if these contact the soil, and has ascending branches. The leaves are oppositely arranged along the stems at and just above a branching fork, further up the leaves alternate. The flower heads sit individually on up to 12 cm (4 1/2 in) long stalks. They are 2–3 cm (4/5–1 1/5 in) in diameter and consist of about twelve to twenty five heavenly blue ray florets that surround many yellow disc florets. Three subspecies have been recognised, that differ in width of the leaves and the involucral bracts, the size of the heads and number of ray florets and in having glandular hairs. These can be found in coastal sands and inland areas in the Western Cape and Eastern Cape provinces of South Africa. Flower heads can be found from June till October.

== Description ==
Felicia amoena subsp. amoena is an upright, up to 25 cm (10 in) high, biennial, possibly sometimes perennial, sometimes near its base a bit woody herb, that mostly branches copiously. The branches are often crowded near the plants foot, while the nodes that rest on the ground easily develop roots, the more distant parts of the side branches ascend. The arrangement of the leaves on the stem changes from opposite to alternating. At the foot the leaves are in several opposite leaf pairs, and further upwards the leaves alternate, but after each branching, the lower one or two pairs are again opposite. The size of the leaves varies greatly, depending on the circumstances, and may be up to 4 cm (1 3/5 in) long and 2 1/2 mm (0.1 in) wide, linear to lance-shaped, bristly hairy, sometimes hairless with age, thick, with curled-down margins.

The flower heads sit individually on, up to 12 cm (4 1/2 in) long, near the top densely felty hairy, stalks, and emerge mostly with three together at the top of the branches. The involucre is up to 7 mm (0.28 in) in diameter and consists of a double row of bracts. The involucral bracts are line- to lance-shaped, about 5 mm (1/5 in) long and adorned with a brush-like tuft of hairs at their tips. The outer bracts are 0.5 mm (0.020 in) wide and carry arched bristles. The inner bracts are 0.6 mm (0.024 in) wide, slightly bristly and have a prominent midrib.

The flower heads have up to twenty five dark blue, female ray florets with straps of about 12 mm (0.47 in) long and 2 mm (0.079 in) wide. These surround many bisexual disc florets with a yellow corolla up to 3 mm (0.12 in) long. In the center of each corolla are five anthers merged into a tube, through which the style grows when the floret opens, hoovering up the pollen on its shaft. At the tip of both style branches is a triangular appendage. Surrounding the base of the corolla are many, white, serrated pappus bristles of about 3 mm (0.12 in) long. The eventually dark brown, dry, one-seeded, indehiscent fruits called cypselae are inverted egg-shaped, about 2.5 mm (0.098 in) long and 1.2 mm (0.047 in) wide, with a prominent ridge along the margin, with some scales on its surface and short, forked hairs.

Felicia amoena subsp. latifolia is a diploid having eight sets of homologue chromosomes (2n=16).

=== Differences between the subspecies ===
Felicia amoena and its three subspecies are among the most variable taxa in the genus. Subsp. amoena is mostly a biennial, has linear to lance-shaped leaves of up to 4 cm (1 3/5 in) long and 2 1/2 mm (0.1 in) wide, with a blunt or slightly pointy tip. Its involucres are relatively large, about 7 mm (0.28 in) in diameter and bracts of about 5 mm (0.20 in) long and 0.5–0.6 mm (0.020–0.024 in) wide. It has up to twenty five ray florets of about 12 mm long and 2 mm wide surrounding yellow disc florets. Subsp. latifolia has broader leaves, that are lance-shaped to inverted egg-shaped, 4–1 3/4 cm long and 4 1/2–10 mm wide. It also has wider involucral bracts at about 5 1/2 mm long and 0.9–1.2 mm (0.035–0.047 in) wide. The disc florets often turn dark red with age. Subsp. stricta is always a perennial with a woody base, slightly sticky because it has glandular hairs, and has small and narrow, pointy leaves of 1–1 3/4 cm long and 2–4 mm (0.079–0.157 in) wide, almost all of which are opposite. Its involucres are relatively small, about 5 mm (0.20 in) in diameter, with bracts only 4 mm (0.16 in) long, with only about twelve ray florets of 8 mm long and 1 1/2 mm wide.

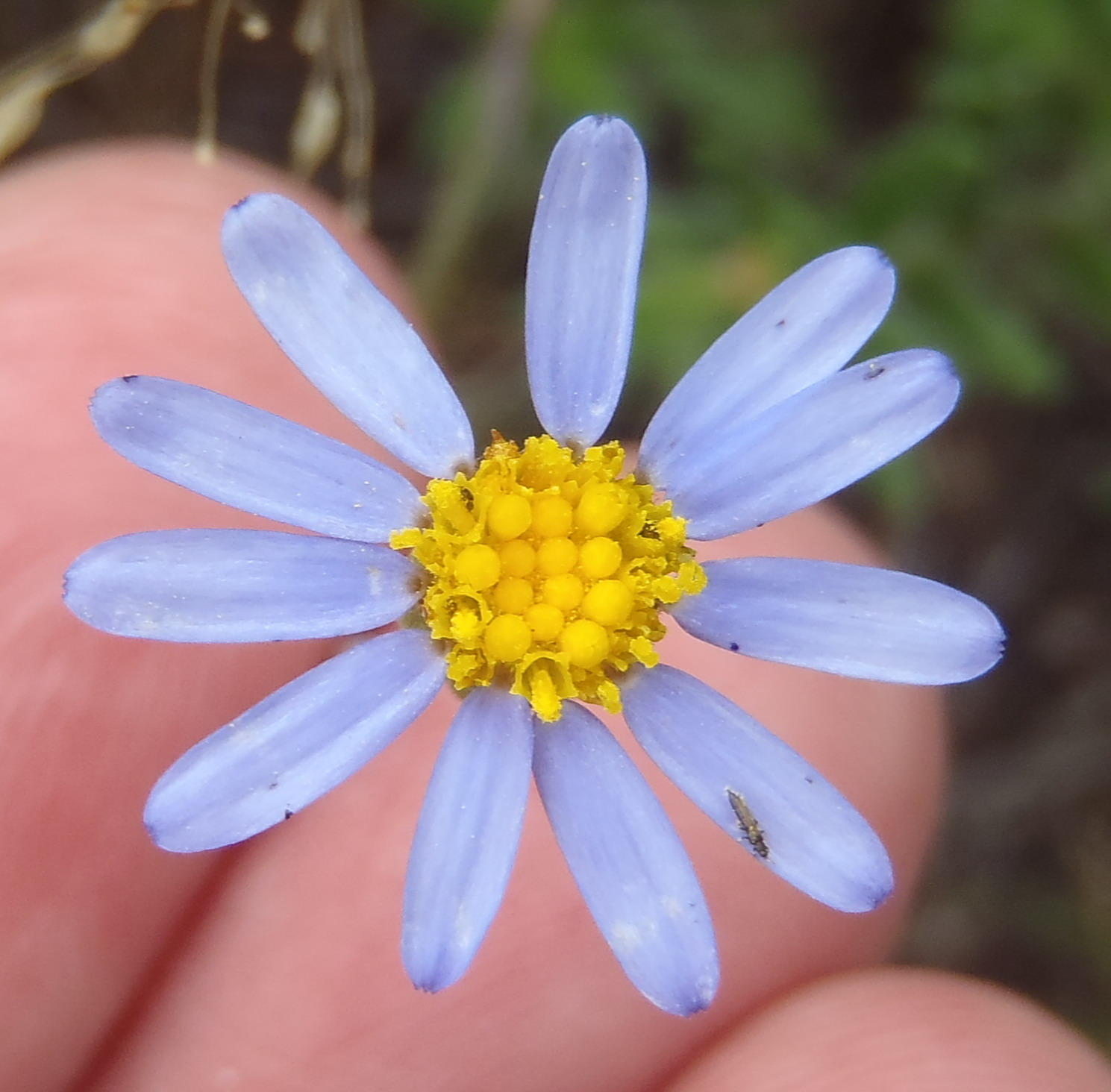
Top view head of subsp. stricta

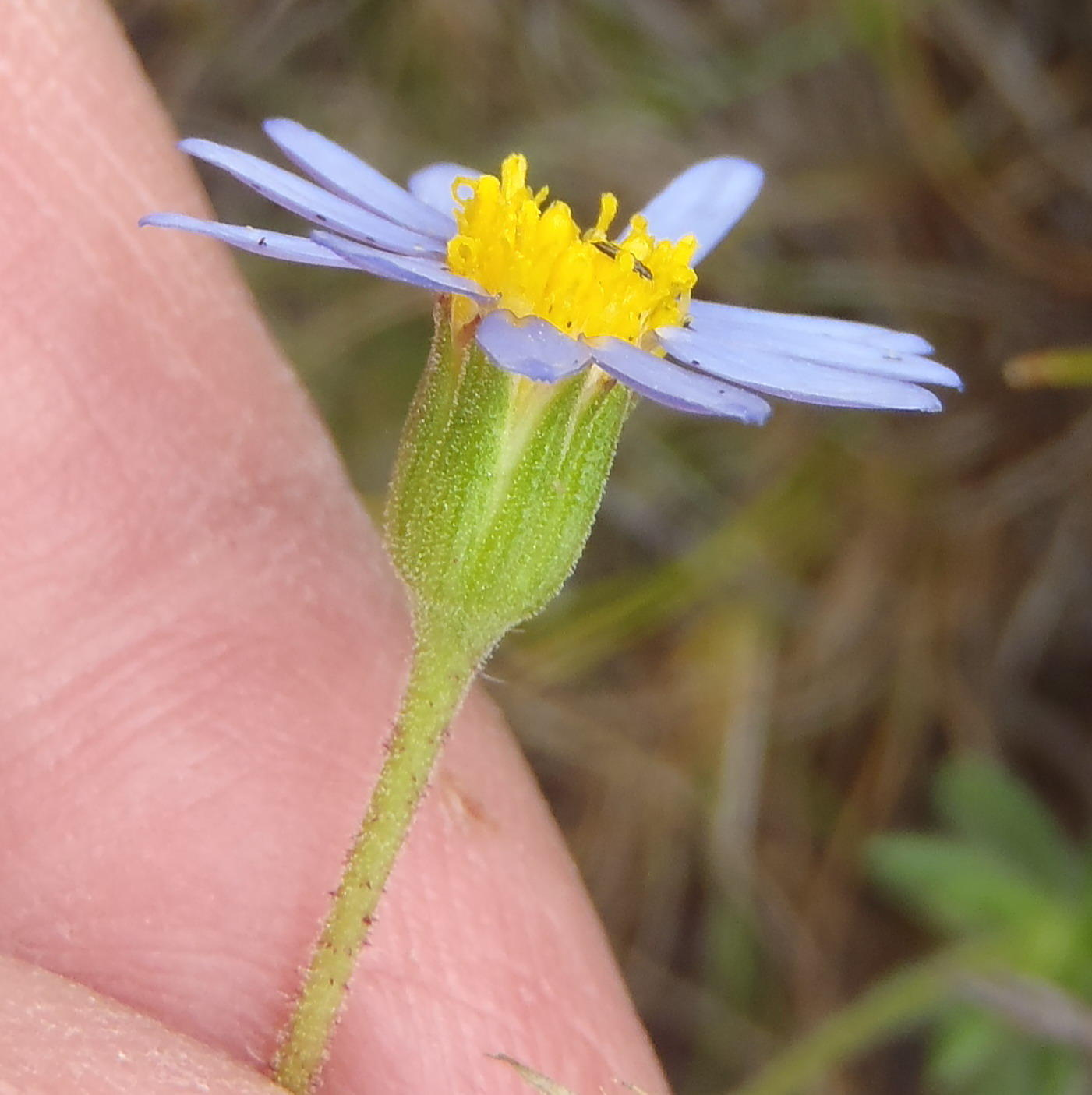
Lateral view head of subsp. stricta

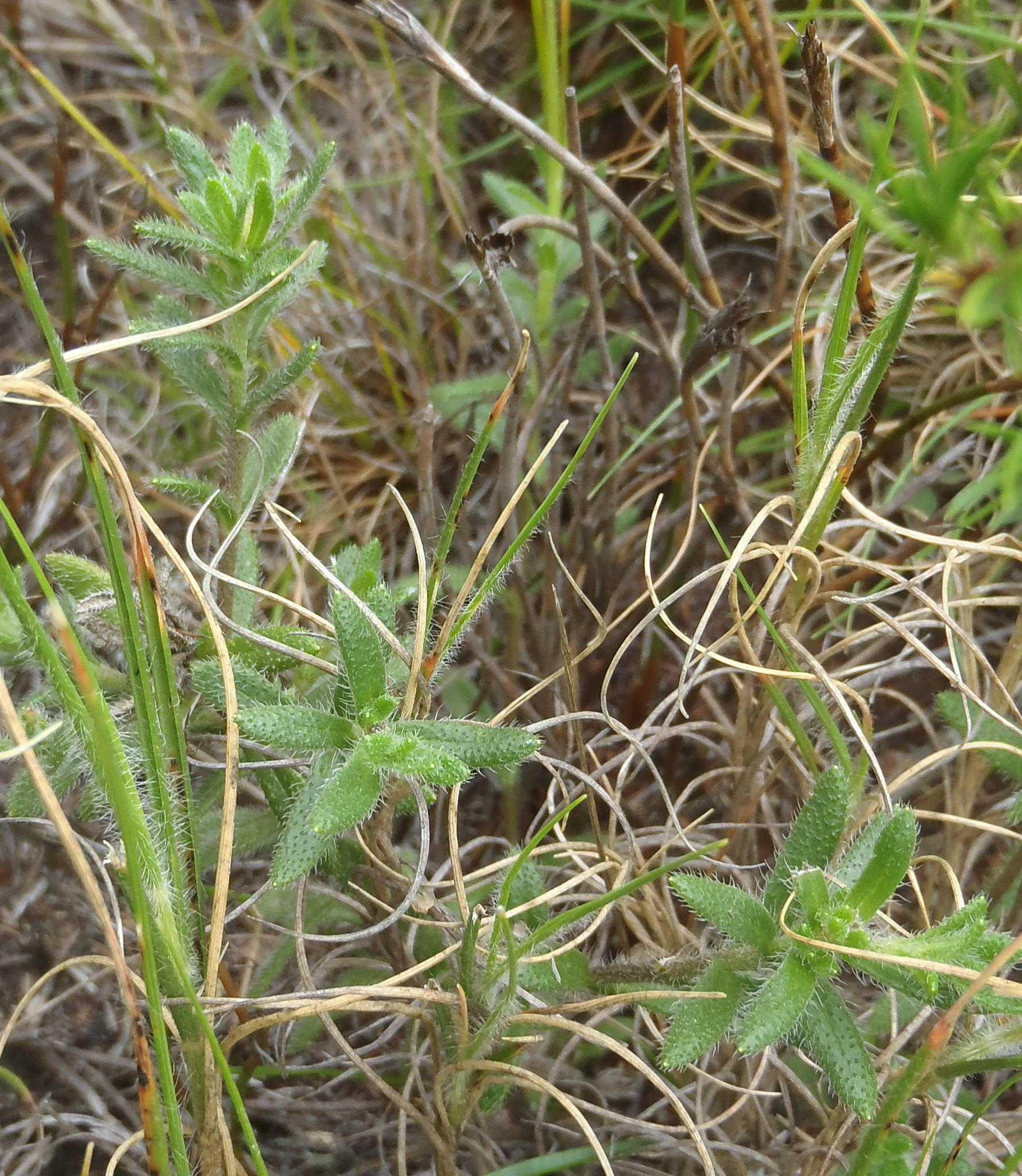
Leaves subsp. stricta

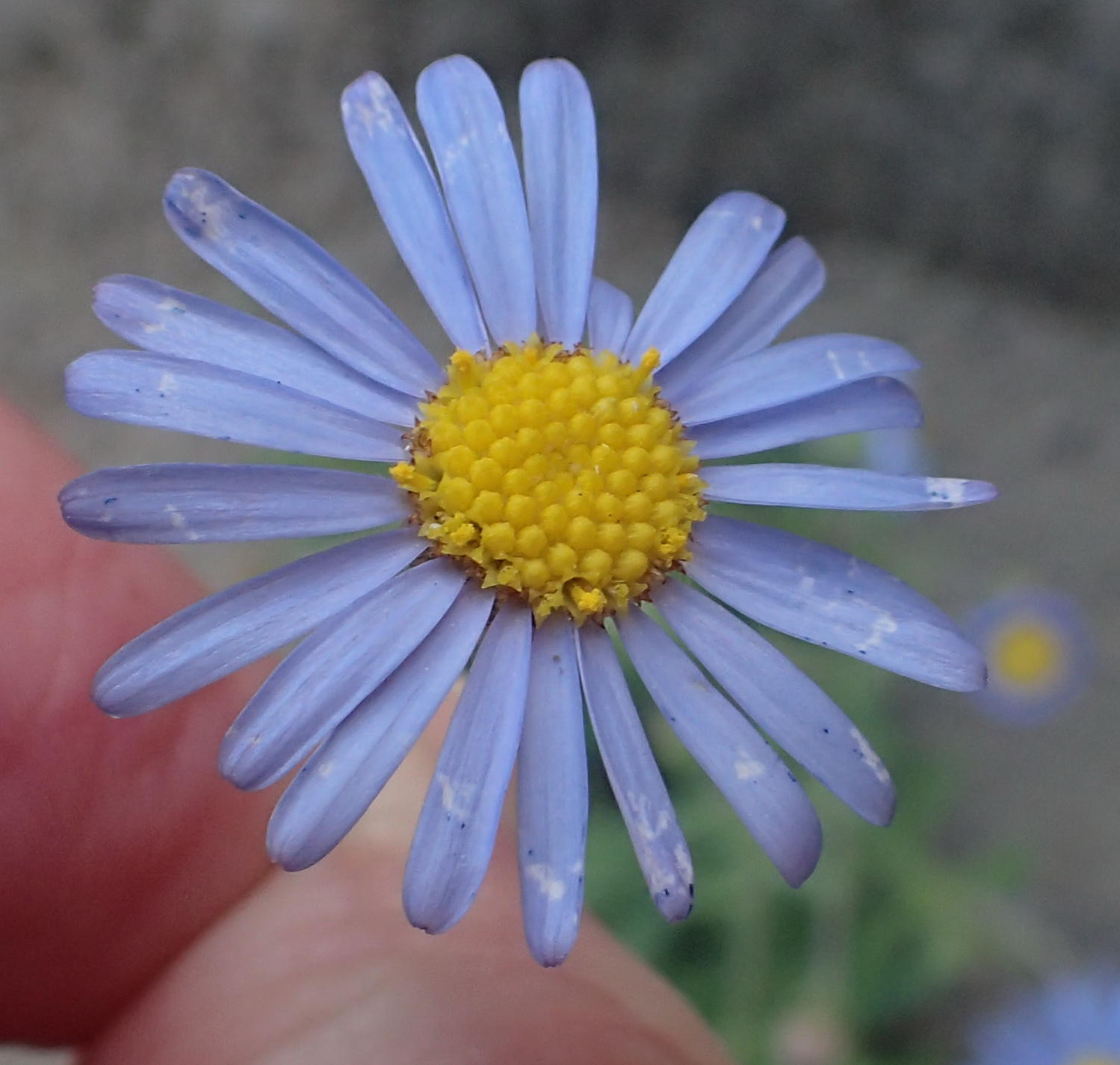
Top view head of subsp. latifolia

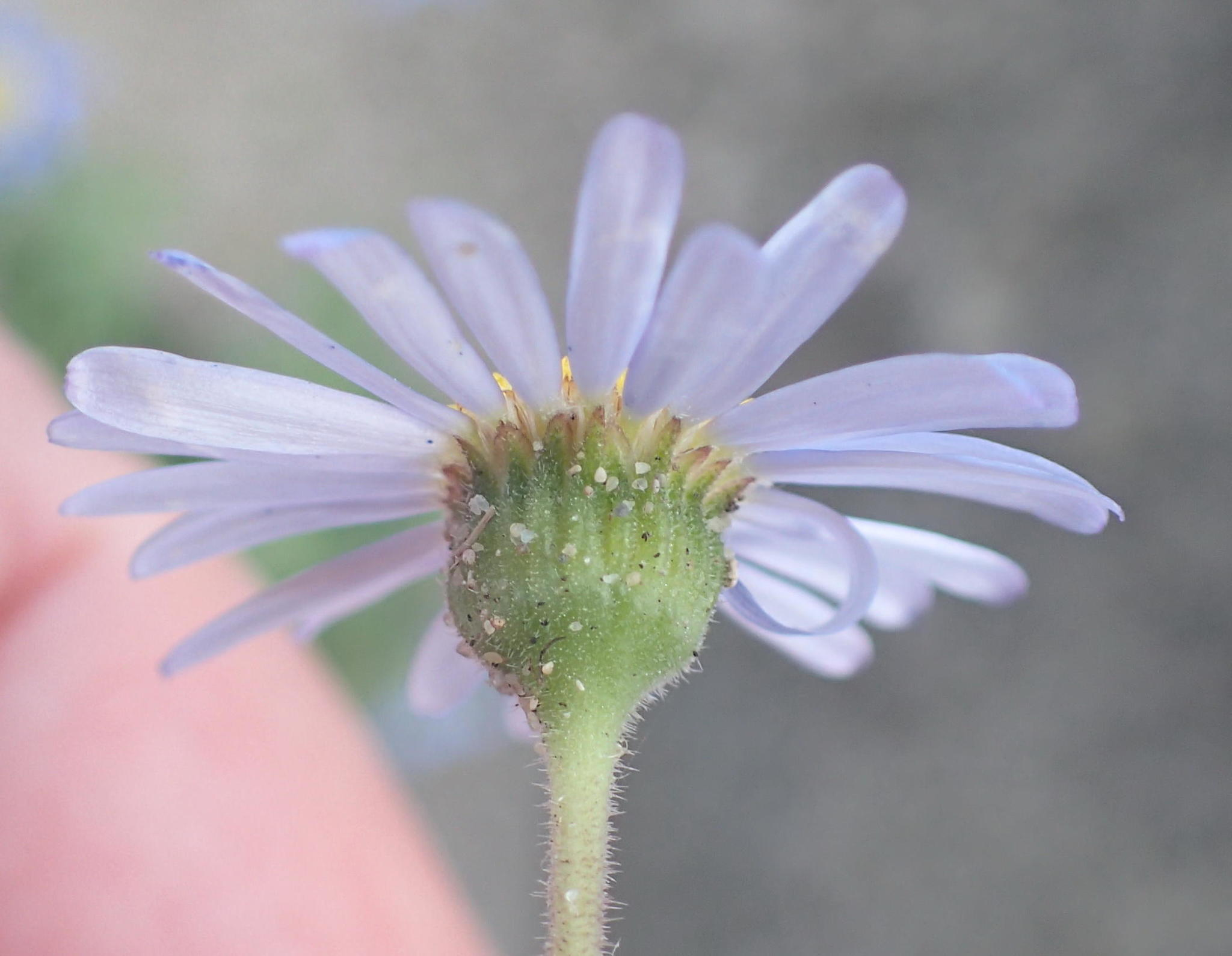
Oblique view of the involucre of subsp. latifolia

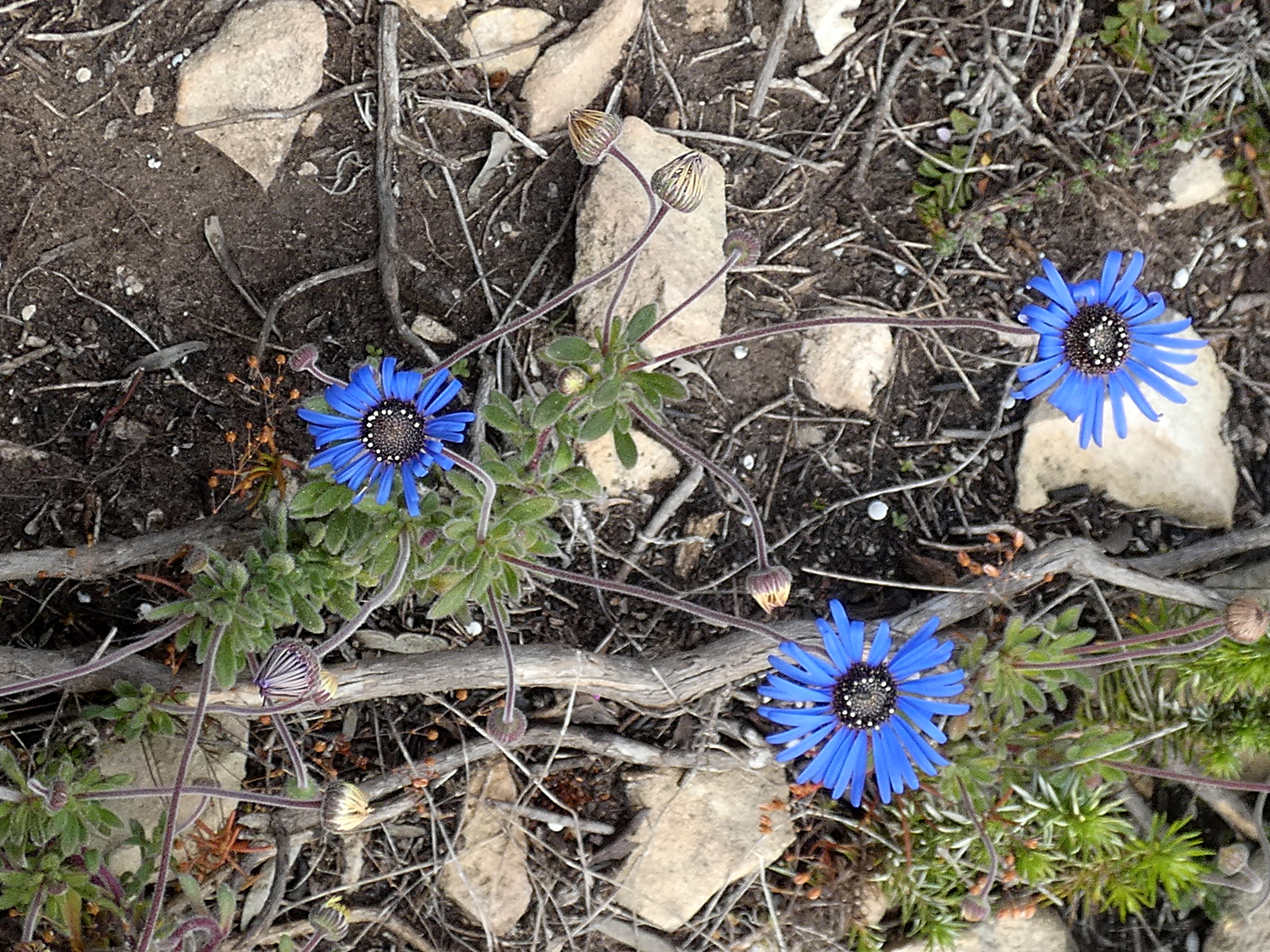
Habit of subsp. latifolia with blackish disc

== Taxonomy and naming ==
As far as known, the first specimen of this daisy species was collected in 1826, where the road from the Potberg crosses the Breede River, by Cape Town organ player Ludwig Beil. It is now assigned to the subspecies latifolia. A plant collected by Johann Franz Drège at Riebeek-Kasteel, was described by Augustin Pyramus de Candolle in 1836, who called it Agathaea stricta, is now assigned to subsp. stricta. The first specimen now assigned to subspecies amoena was collected from Hout Bay on the west coast of the Cape Peninsula by Christian Ferdinand Friedrich Krauss in 1838. It was described in 1843 by Carl Heinrich "Bipontinus" Schultz, who named it Agathaea amoena. In 1865, William Henry Harvey, who was a lumper, sunk Agataea in Aster, creating the combination Aster amoenus. He distinguished a slightly different specimen, that had been collected by Karl Wilhelm Ludwig Pappe, and named it after him Aster pappei. Harvey further distinguished Aster elongatus var. spathulaefolius in the same publication. Finally Harvey regarded De Candolle's specimen as a variety that should be placed under Christian Friedrich Lessing's species Aster adfinis (now Felicia dubia), creating the combination Aster adfinis var. stricta. In 1948, the eminent South African botanist Margaret Levyns created the combination Felicia amoena, that is still in use today. In his 1973 Revision of the genus Felicia (Asteraceae), Jürke Grau distinguished three subspecies: F. amoena subsp. amoena, F. amoena subsp. stricta, and his new taxon F. amoena subsp. latifolia. The species is considered to be part of the section Neodetris.

The species epithet amoena means "beautiful" or "pleasing" and is said to refer to the attractive flower heads.

== Distribution, habitat and ecology ==
Felicia amoena subsp. amoena has the smaller distribution of the three subspecies. It is restricted to the sandy soils around the Cape Peninsula and near Gordons Bay. Subsp. latifolia has the largest area and occurs along the coast from the Cape Peninsula in the very west to the mouth of the Sundays River in the east. An isolated population also occurs in the southern Cedarberg. Subsp. stricta can be found inland, from the Cedarberg in the north, via the Piketberg along the western edge, around Ceres, near Worcester and Swellendam on the eastern edge to Bredasdorp in the south.

== Conservation ==
The continued survival of all three subspecies of Felicia amoena is considered to be of least concern because their populations are stable.
