= Anthony Hurt Wolley-Dod =

English botanist (1861–1948)

Anthony Hurt Wolley-Dod (17 November 1861 in Eton College, Buckinghamshire – 21 June 1948 in Mayfield Sussex) was a British soldier and botanist. The fourth son of the Rev. Charles Wolley-Dod, of Edge Hall, Cheshire, an assistant master at Eton, and his wife Frances Lucy Pelly, he trained at the Royal Military Academy, Woolwich, was commissioned to the Royal Artillery in 1881 and retired as a major in 1901. In the First World War he was remobilized and served as lieutenant colonel. He collected plants in South Africa, Gibraltar, California and extensively in the United Kingdom. He donated his collection of several thousand South African specimens to the British Museum, to which he also bequeathed his herbarium. He married firstly, in 1888, Agnes Gardyne Macintosh (died 29 October 1917), who bore him a daughter, Mabel Florence (born 1889); he married secondly, on 4 April 1922, Eileen Griffin.

== Works ==
- A flora of Gibraltar and the neighbourhood. West, Newman & Company. 1914.
- A list of British roses. West, Newman. 1911.
- Flora of Sussex. Chatford House Press. 1937.
- Flora capensis: a list of plants recorded from Gibraltar and the Campo District of Spain. American Consulate. 1949.
