= Heterogamy =

Difference

Heterogamy is a term derived from combining the Greek word heteros meaning ("different") and gamos meaning ("marriage"). This term has three meanings one for biology, one for botany and one for social science.

== Science ==
=== Biology ===
In biology, heterogamy is sexual reproduction in which two types of gametes fuse, these gametes are usually of varying sizes, forms, and biological functions. This type of heterogamy occurs for example in some aphids. Alternately, heterogamy or heterogamous is often used as a synonym of heterogametic, meaning the presence of two unlike chromosomes in a sex.

=== Botany ===
In botany, a plant is heterogamous when it carries at least two different types of flowers in regard to their reproductive structures, for example male and female flowers or bisexual and female flowers. Stamens and carpels are not regularly present in each flower or floret.

== Social science ==
In sociology, heterogamy refers to a marriage between two individuals from different social, racial, age, gender or ethnic groups. For instance, ethnic heterogamy involves partners that come from different ethnic backgrounds, while age heterogamy describes a relationship with a notable age gap between two individuals. more broadly heterogamy refers to a union of people who differ in certain characteristics.

- Heterogametic
- Homogametic
