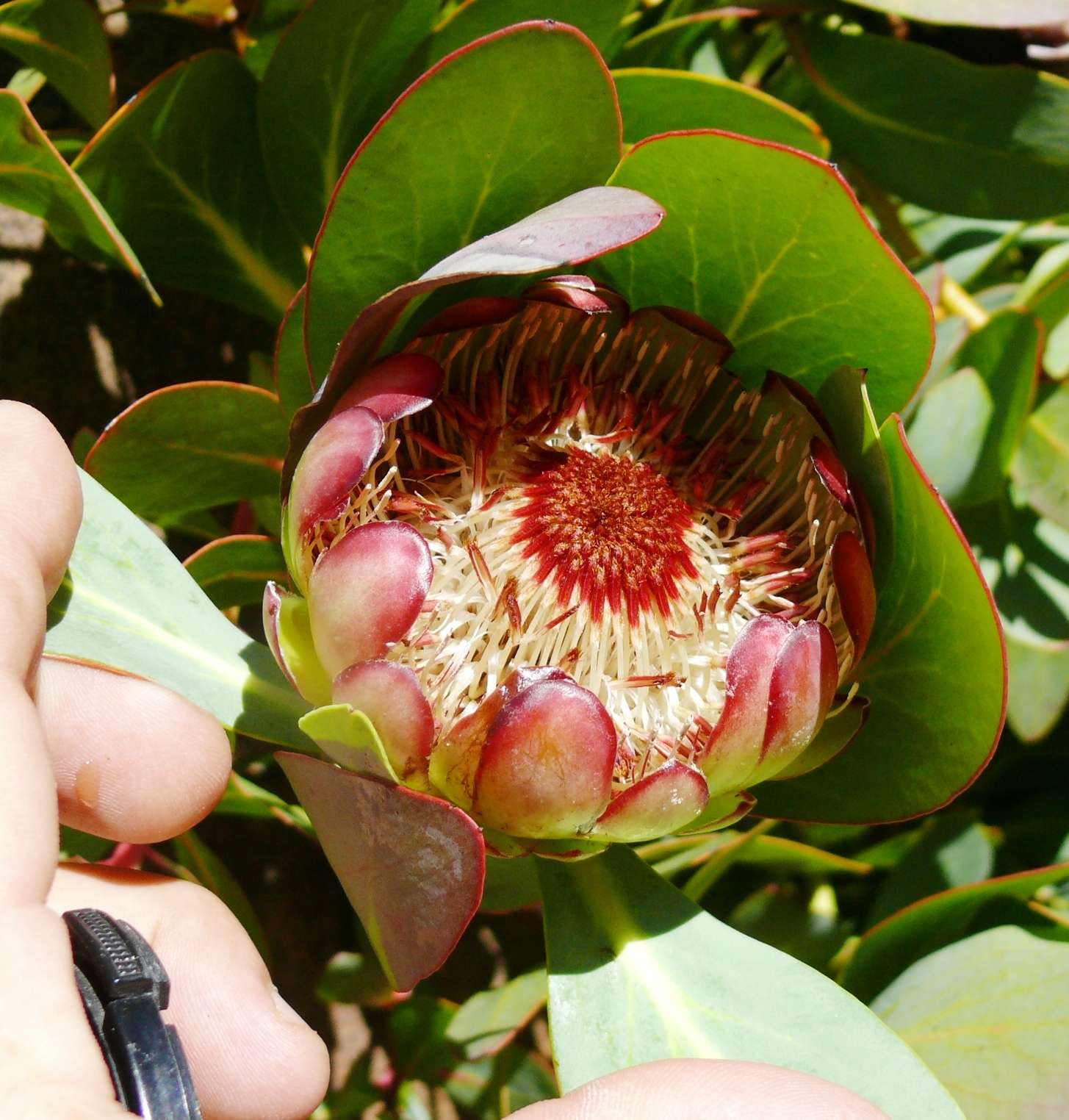

Conservation status
- Near Threatened (IUCN 3.1)

Scientific classification
- Kingdom: Plantae
- Clade: Embryophytes
- Clade: Tracheophytes
- Clade: Angiosperms
- Clade: Eudicots
- Order: Proteales
- Family: Proteaceae
- Genus: Protea
- Species: P. recondita

Binomial name
- Protea recondita H.Buek ex Meisn.

Synonyms
- Scolymocephalus reconditus Kuntze

= Protea recondita =

Species of flowering plant

Protea recondita, also known as the hidden sugarbush, is a flowering plant of the genus Protea within the family Proteaceae, which is endemic to the Cape Region of South Africa, and distributed from the Piketberg and Cederberg to the Groot Winterhoek mountains. The flowers of this unusual plant are pollinated by non-flying mammals: rodents and elephant shrews. In the Afrikaans language it is known as gesigtoehouprotea or skaamroos.

== Taxonomy ==
The German horticulturalist, botanical collector and explorer Johann Franz Drège collected the first scientific specimen of this species in December 1830 at a place called 'Ezelsbank' (possibly a farm), in the area of the town of Clanwilliam, at 4,000–5,000 feet (1,200–1,500 m) on a rocky eastern flank of a krantz in the Cederberg range, through where he travelled during one of his expeditions throughout South Africa. Protea recondita was apparently first named and identified as a new species by Heinrich Wilhelm Buek, but the name was an invalid nomen nudum because it was not published with a formal species description, but only existed as a name on the labels of herbarium specimens. Drège himself may have been the first to actually publish the name in his 1843 work Zwei pflanzengeographische Documente, which detailed where and when he collected what during his botanical journeys, but it was Carl Meissner who in 1856 finally validated the name with a description in the Prodromus, a book series of botanic taxonomy begun by Augustin Pyramus de Candolle.

=== Type ===
Drège made a number of different exsiccata specimen sheets from his Ezelsbank collection, and these he traded or sold across Europe. In Britain, for example, a sheet found its way into respectively both the herbaria of George Bentham and Joseph Dalton Hooker at Kew.

=== Etymology ===
The local Afrikaans vernacular name skaamroos translates as 'shy' or 'bashful' 'rose', and likely refers to the inflorescences, which are hidden by the leaves which fold over and around it. The name gesigtoehouprotea translates as 'face-withholding protea'.

== Description ==
=== Habitus ===
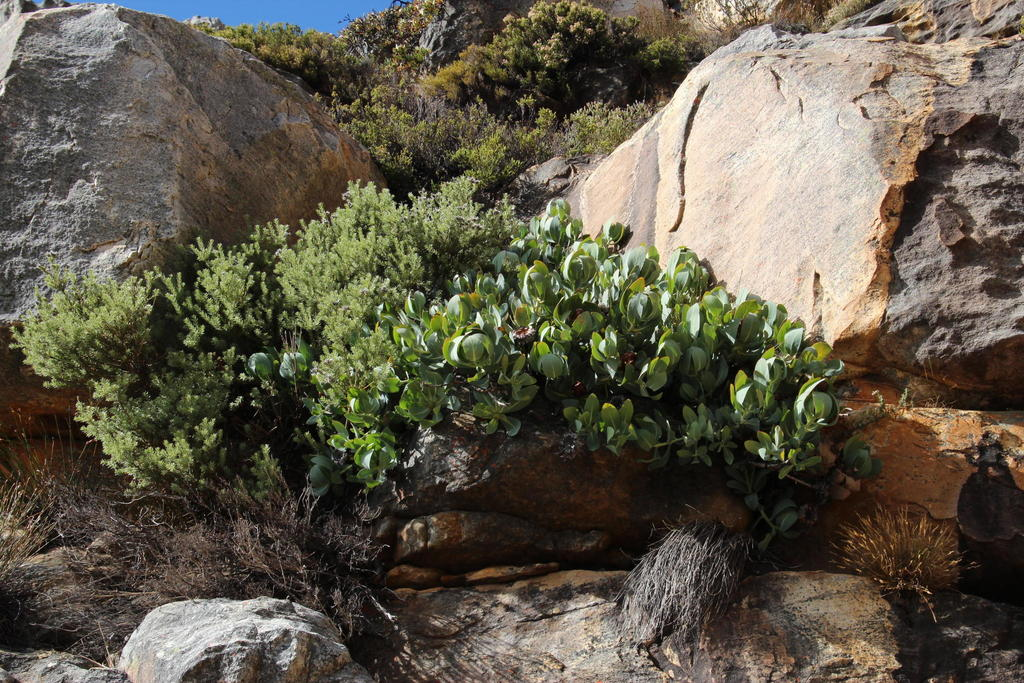
Protea recondita habitus in the autumn, in situ on the slopes of the Sneeuberg in the Cederberg Wilderness Area in April

Protea recondita is a sprawling shrub up to 3 metres (9.8 ft) across and 1 metre (3.3 ft) in height. The branches are glaucous and glabrous.

=== Leaves ===
It has large, thick, glaucous and glabrous leaves. These leaves are 3–4.5 inches (7.6–11.4 cm) in length and 1–2 inches (2.5–5.1 cm) broad at the widest parts, although they are only 4.2mm wide at the base (where they connect to the petiole). The shape of the leaves is obovate and cuneate, and the ends of the leaves are rounded (obtuse). The leaves are distinctly veined.

=== Flowers ===
The small flowers (called florets) are clustered together in a special structure containing a few hundred blooms. Unlike most rodent-pollinated proteas, in P. recondita this inflorescence, or more specifically a pseudanthia (also called a 'flower head'), is apical, budding from the tops of the stems as opposed to from their sides. The flower head is furthermore sessile, which means it has no stalk (a 'peduncle'), but arises directly from the leafy branch. The head is globose in shape, 1.5–2.5 inches (3.8–6.4 cm) in length, and about 2 inches (5.1 cm) in diameter. The glabrous involucral bracts are arranged in a series of seven to eight rows. The outer bracts are ovate and somewhat acuminate in shape, and have an almost round apex ('subobtuse'). The inner bracts are oblong in shape and slightly convex, and equal in length to the actual flowers. It is monoecious, both sexes occur in each flower. The petals and sepals of the florets are fused into a tube-like, 25.5mm long perianth-sheath which is glabrous, except for a few reddish hairs near the lip. This sheath is dilated, having three keels and five veins on the lower part. The sheath has a lip which is 6.5mm long. The lip is glabrous or sometimes sparingly setulose (with bristly hairs). All of the stamens are fertile. The filament is 0.28mm long, broad and thin. The anthers are linear-elliptic and 4.2mm long. The apical glands are 0.28mm in length, ovate in shape and with a somewhat rounded tip (subobtuse). The ovary is 8.5mm long, oblanceolate in outline, and covered in long, reddish-brown hairs. The upper part of the ovary is swollen. The style is pallid in colour, compressed, glabrous, over 1 inch (2.5 cm) in length, 2.1mm wide but tapers from the base, and becomes falcate after arising from a short, almost straight base. The grooved stigma is 3.2 to 4.2mm long, linear, with an obtuse (blunt) end, and almost imperceptibly joins together and becomes the style.

The blooms are produced at the ends of the erect branches in the winter, mostly in May to July, sometimes extending to September. As the inflorescence begins to bud, the surrounding leaves on the stem below it grow to curve over and around the flower head, enfolding it like those of a cabbage, so as to completely hide it from view. The flowers, or more specifically the nectar, exude an odd, not unpleasant, yeasty odour, with a sweetish scent superimposed.

=== Fruit ===
Although an inflorescence contains many hundreds of florets, most proteas commonly have an infructescence with only a very low seed set, around 10%, or usually less than two dozen seeds. In this species, however, the seed set was found to be respectively 29% and 18% from two

populations (Sneeubergnek, Murray Farm) of which ten and eleven heads were sampled. These two populations had respectively 258 florets per flower head (with a range of 118 to 379), and 393 (338 to 436), on average.

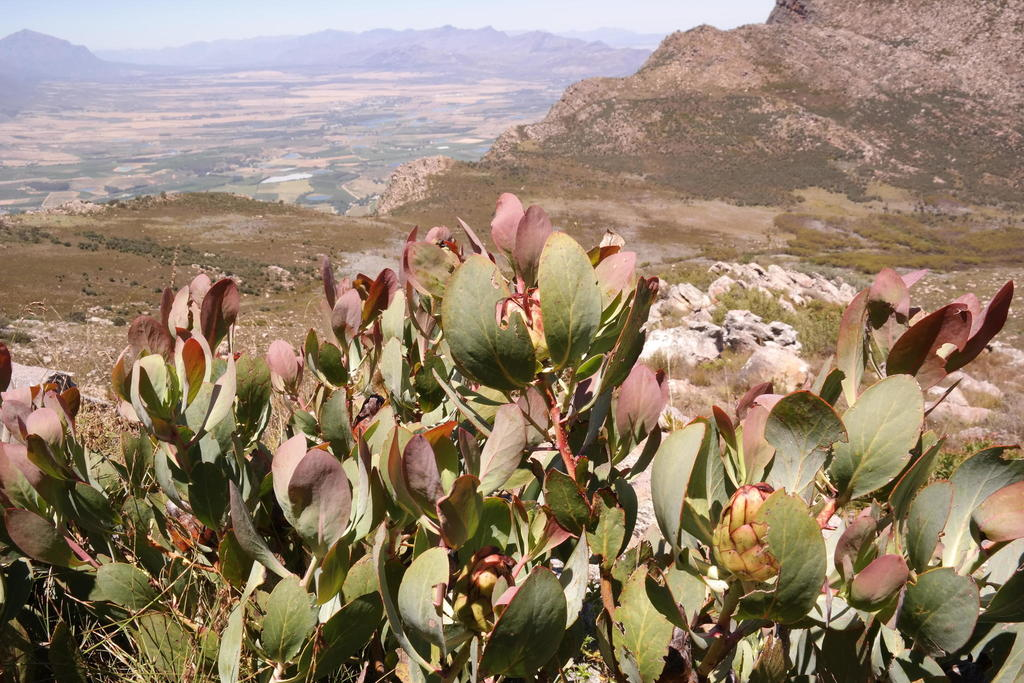

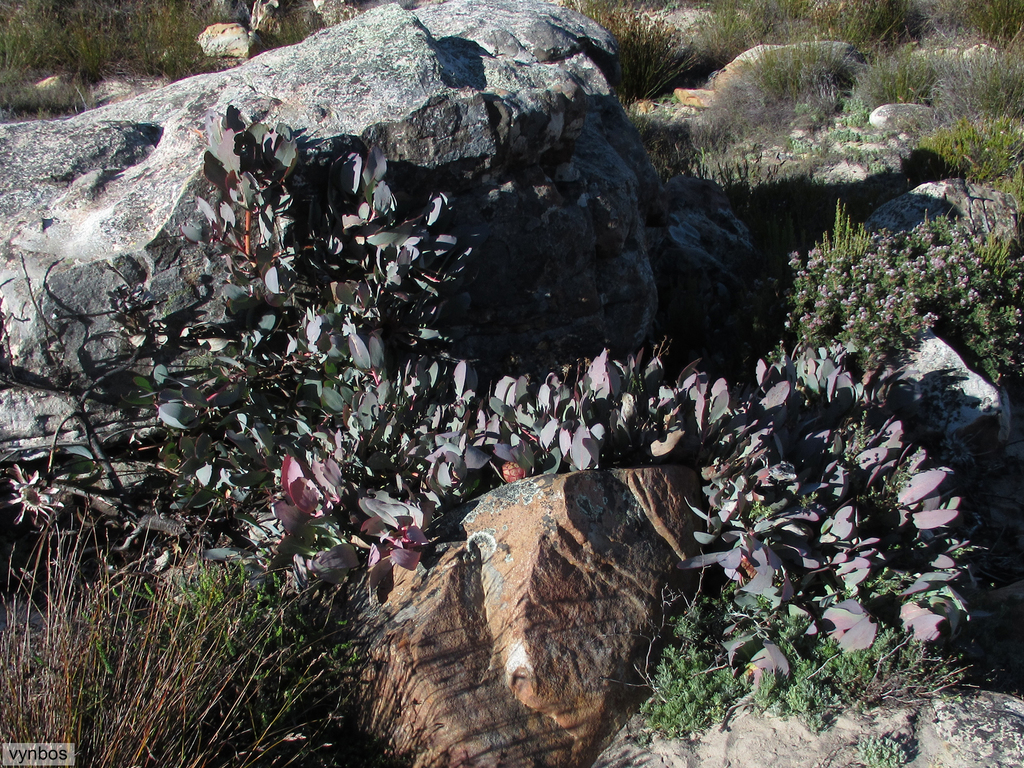

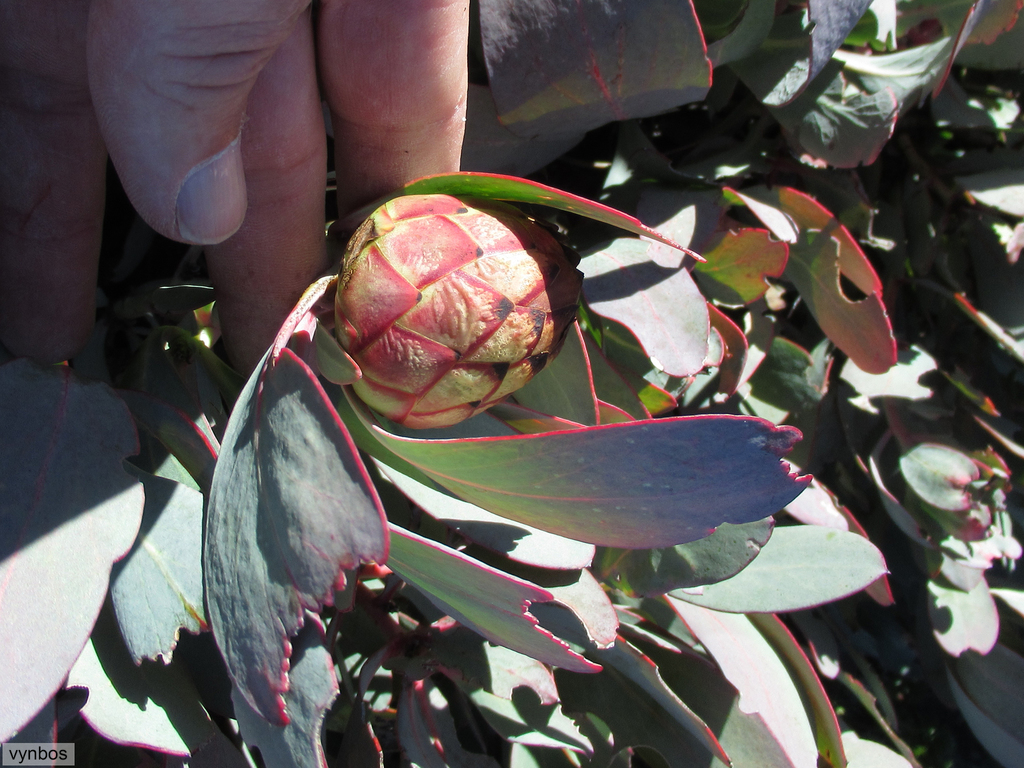

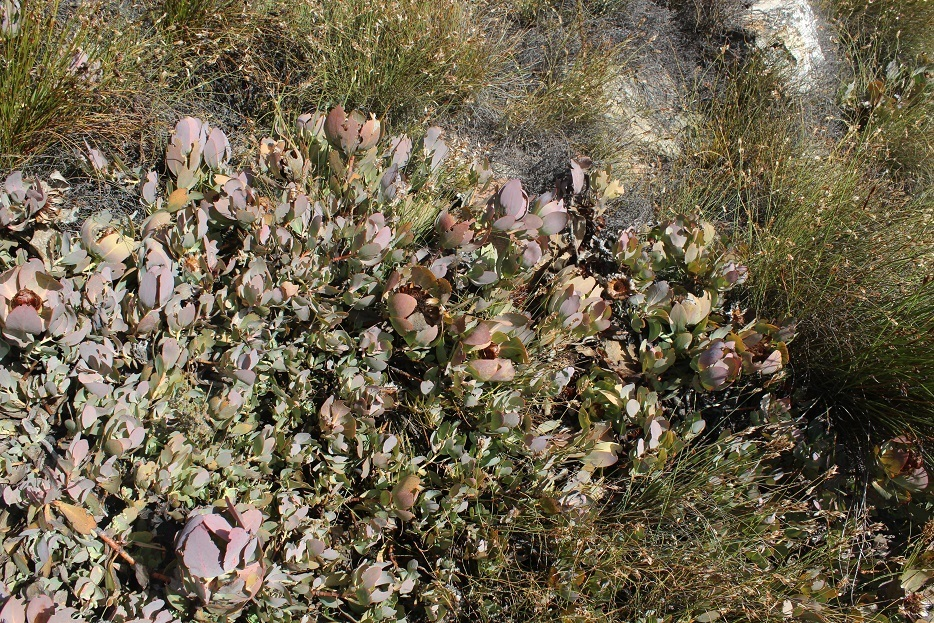

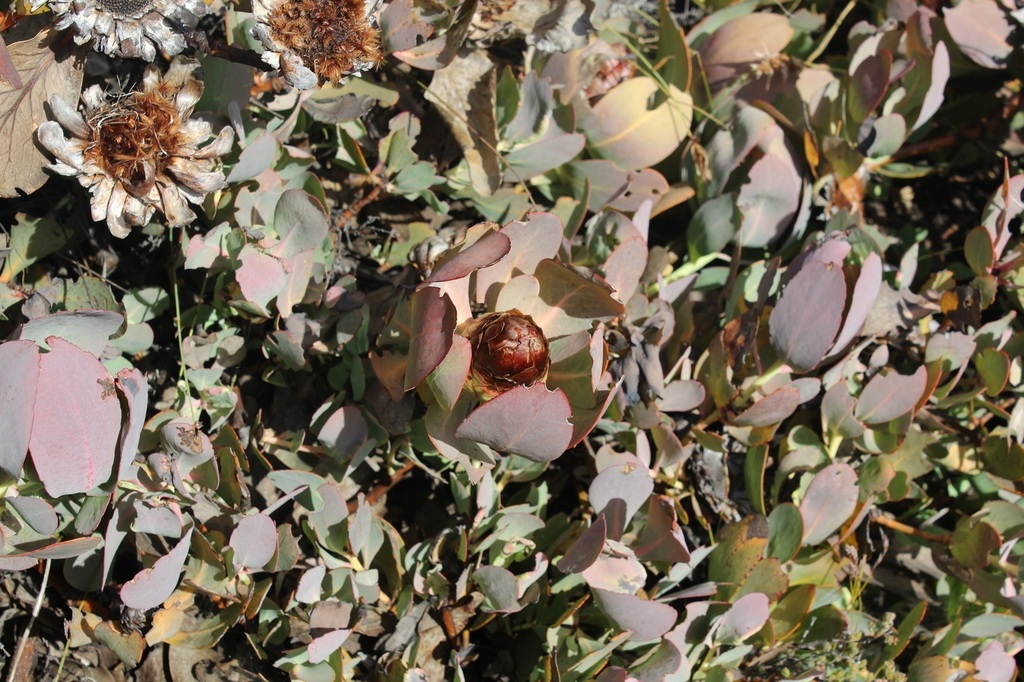

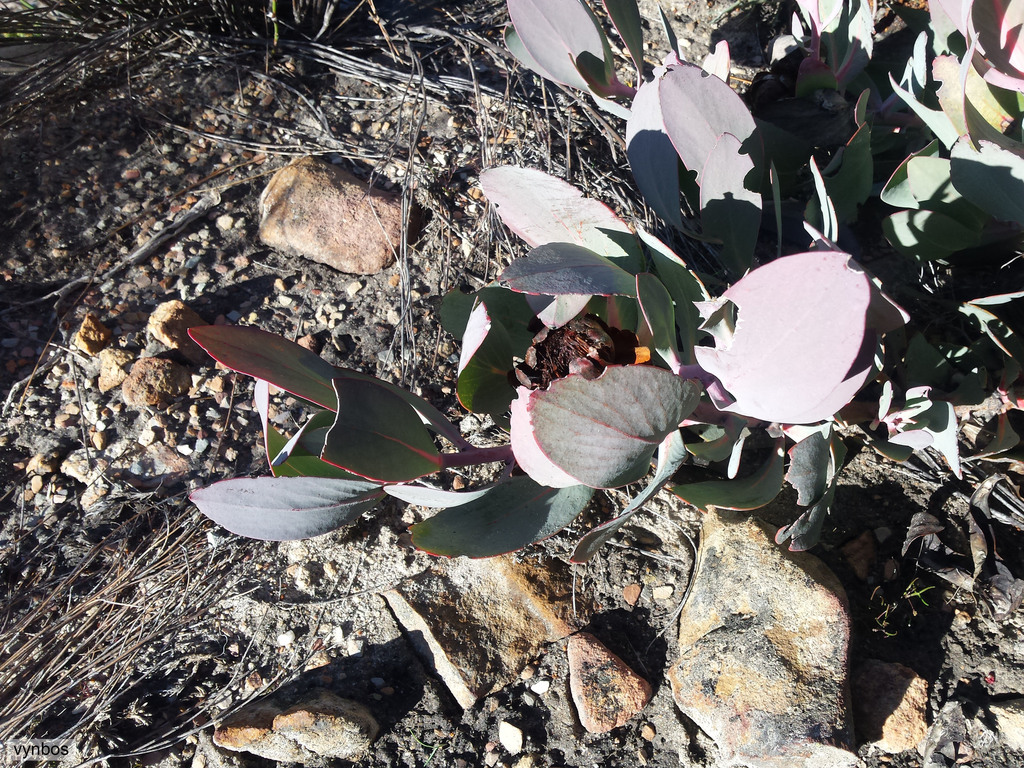

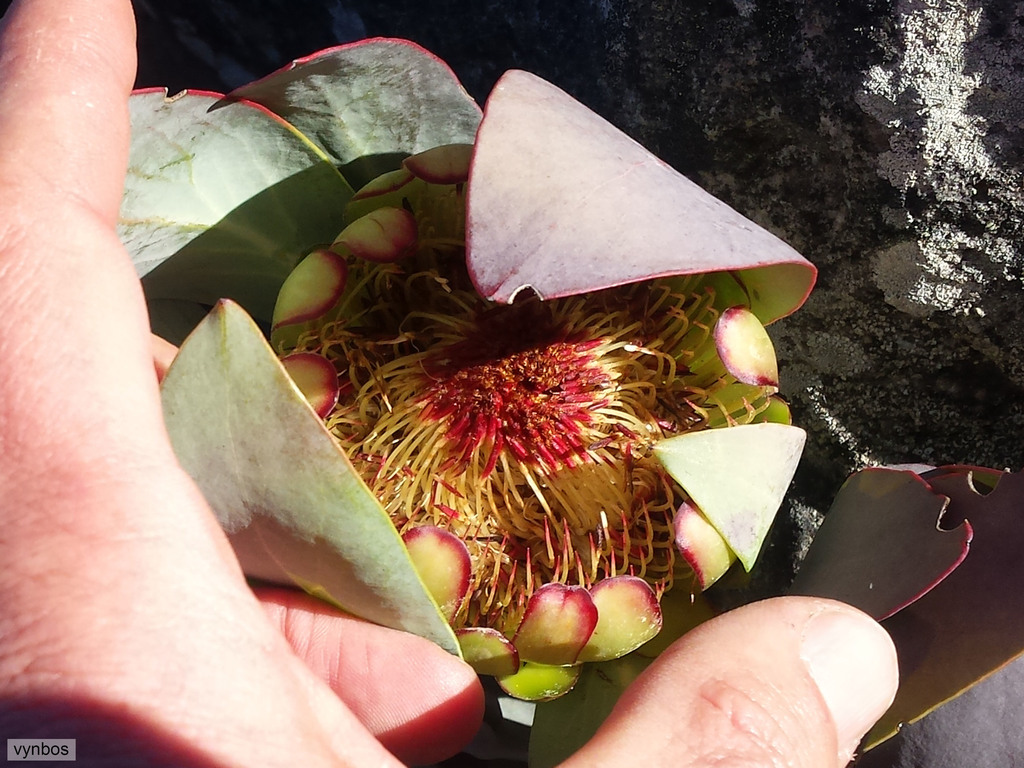

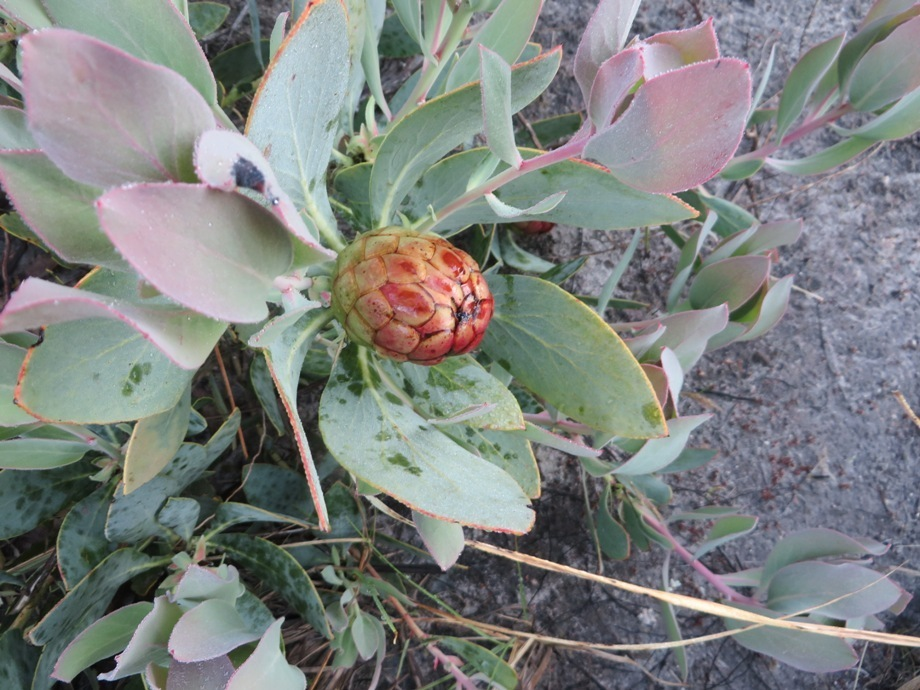

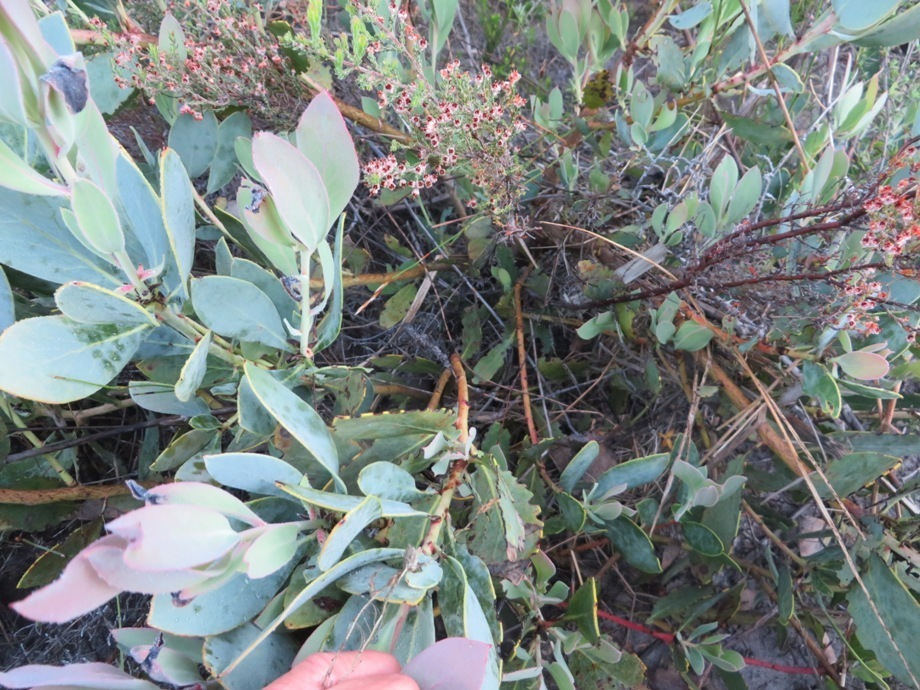

=== Similar species ===
According to Meissner in 1856 it is most similar to Protea grandiceps, especially in leaf-form, but with a smaller flower head. P. foliosa, which occurs further to the east, also has terminal flower heads which are somewhat wrapped by the surrounding and subtending leaves and bracts, but in this species the heads are bourne low to the ground.

== Distribution ==
The species is endemic to the Western Cape province of South Africa. The range of this species stretches from the Piketberg and Cederberg in the north, southwards to the Groot Winterhoek, and apparently even further south to the Koue Bokkeveld Mountains. The species is known to occur at much more than ten localities. Although it occurs in a total area of 4,008 km^{2} (1,547 sq mi), the territory where it actually grows, the area of occupancy, only stretches across 272 km^{2} (105 sq mi) within this.

The Piketberg is an inselberg; a single, tiny population is found atop it, which as of 2004 only consists of only two individual plants.

== Ecology ==
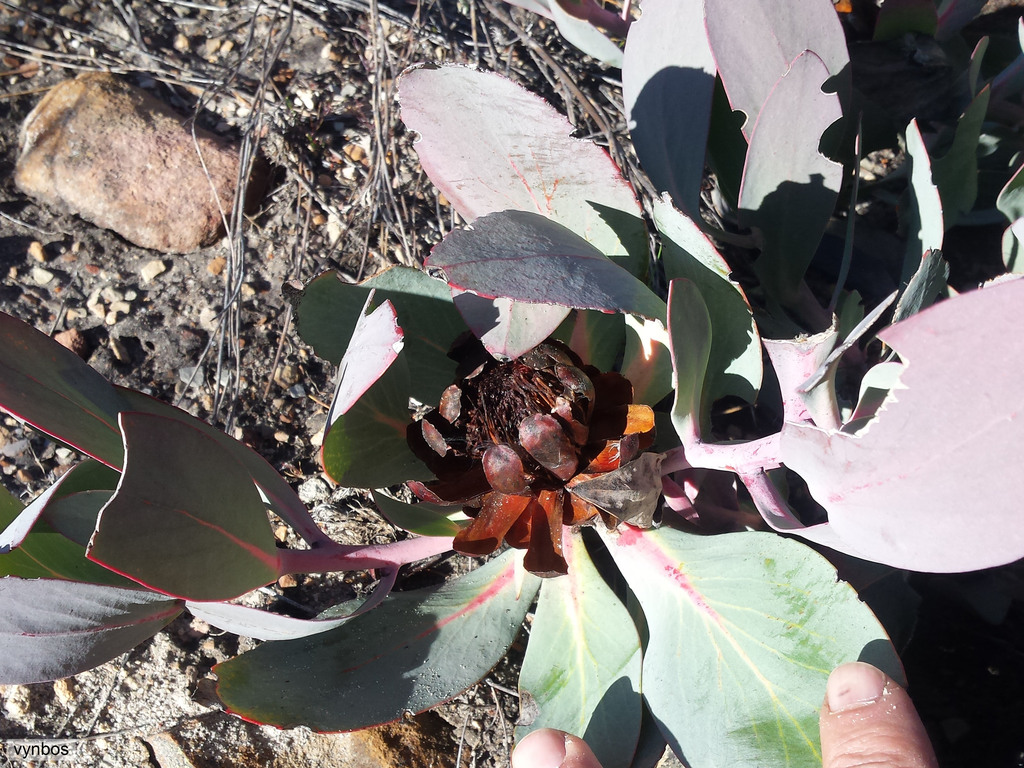
The leaves of Protea recondita curve over the flower heads of the plant as they mature, completely covering it -the photographer is holding them away in this photograph. This is thought to be an evolutionary adaption to hide the flowers from birds and insects; the preferred pollinators, rodents, do not use sight to find the flowers, but smell.

Most proteas experience only little incidence of insect seed predation.

=== Habitat ===
This species is mostly found growing on rocky slopes near mountain summits, at between 1,000 and 2,000 metres (3,300 and 6,600 ft), or 800 and 1,800 in altitude. The only habitat where it grows is otherwise montane fynbos on sandstone-derived soils. The plants are rare and scattered in the rocky habitats most especially found in the north of its range, but in the Groot Winterhoek mountains in the south of its range it is found in open habitat in which it may form isolated, but locally dominant, dense clumps.

It was first collected together at Ezelsbank with the fynbos shrubs Elytropappus spinellosus, Oedera sedifolia, Passerina rigida (unlikely), Phylica capitata, Pteronia fasciculata, Rafnia ovata and Stoebe aethiopica; the herbs Agathelpis brevifolia, Agathosma sp., Hydrocotyle sp., Pelargonium patulum, Pharnaceum serpyllifolium, Pseudoselago guttata and an Othonna-like plant; a succulent Crassula sp.; the bulb Ornithogalum thyrsoides; the restios Restio laniger and Thamnochortus sp.; the grass Pentameris malouinensis; and the ferns Anemia caffrorum and Lomaria pumila. At the same locality, Murray Farm, P. recondita grows together with P. effusa, P. laurifolia and P. pendula. At the Sneeubergnek locality it grows together with P. cryophila and P. punctata.

=== Pollination ===
Although a 1998 source stated that the flowers are pollinated by birds, other sources claim it is pollinated by rodents. In 1977 the botanists Delbert Wiens and John Patrick Rourke first proposed this pollination method in certain Protea species. In a 1980 magazine article Rourke explained his theory that the peculiarly hidden flower heads had evolved this trait in response to using rodents as pollination vectors, thus constituting a special class of pollination syndrome. Because the rodents are primarily nocturnal creatures that find their food using their sense of smell rather than their sense of sight, the flower heads are not required to be showy. Furthermore, by hiding the flower heads in such a manner, the plants' chosen rodent pollinators are protected from predation by owls. The data on this species is somewhat murky, but it appears that this is a species which primarily opens its florets at night, likely also to accommodate the pollinators. The peculiar yeasty odour of the nectar becomes stronger at night, is thought to furthermore be a specially evolved attribute which attracts rodent pollinators. The nectar of most such proteas is copious and extremely sweet, which attracts the rodents, but it also low in protein and not very nutritious, and functions more like 'junk-food' or candy. The scent is so seductive for small mammals that even gerbils (Gerbilliscus afra), which are not known as nectar-feeders, caught from areas where such proteas do not grow, are readily attracted to the rodent-pollinated protea flower heads as opposed to those of bird-pollinated proteas when experimentally exposed to both. Rodents in captivity which were fed a diet of only nectar died after five days. The amount of nectar produced by a particular population is only sufficient to sustain the local rodents for several days a year.

Despite all the adaptations the plant has made, the pollinators are not dependant on the plants, nor do they appear to be specifically evolved to take advantage of the plants, instead Wiens et al. suggest that the evolution which has occurred is unilateral on the part of the plant.

Of the dozen or more species of rodent-pollinated proteas, P. recondita is the only species with non-geoflorous flower heads -instead bearing them above it in the air at the end of the erect branches, to have evolved such a system of enfolding leaves, which make the flower head 'cryptic'. This indicates it evolved non-flying mammal pollination independently from the other proteas growing in the area which have also adopted this method of transporting pollen.

In 1983 Wiens, Rourke and colleagues had the results of their research on the subject published. The small mammal species Aethomys namaquensis, Myomyscus verreauxii, Rhabdomys pumilio and Elephantulus edwardii were caught in almost equal amounts in traps in P. recondita shrubs, and all four species have been experimentally confirmed to feed on and pollinate Protea florets in the laboratory. E. edwardii, which is in fact not a rodent but an elephant shrew, only licked the tops of the flower heads, but is thought to thus likely pollinate the florets anyway. E. edwardii and the diurnal mouse Rhabdomys pumilio were captured with large amounts of pollen in faecal samples taken directly from the colon, which likely was due to ingestion during the grooming of their snouts. Faecal pellets, also containing pollen, of these creatures was the only defecation found in the flower heads of this Protea, which due to the terminal placements and protected nature of the heads can only come from frequent and relatively long visits of animals crawling inside the flower. Aethomys and Rhabdomys have been caught and seen higher up in the branches of rodent-pollinated proteas, and thus may be better at pollinating specifically this protea. Rodent pollinators may sometimes nibble on the bracts and styles of flower heads, destroying a percentage of the structure on a number of inflorescences, R. pumilio appears to be most likely responsible for this.

=== Wildfires ===
The adult plants are killed by the wildfires which periodically move through its habitat, but the seeds can survive such an event. After the flowers are pollinated, the mature fruit is retained in the infructescence: fire-resistant seed heads which are persistently retained for a few years on the plant. When they are eventually released after fires, the seeds are dispersed by the wind.

== Conservation ==
Protea recondita is a locally common species in the southern third of its range, but the numbers of the total population are thought to be decreasing, because certain northern subpopulations are declining. According to the South African National Biodiversity Institute (SANBI) in 2019, it is especially threatened by habitat fragmentation from natural reasons, as well as possibly too frequent wildfires, overgrazing by livestock and invasive plants, although none of these threats are considered severe. Although they considered the species to be too common to classify the conservation status as 'vulnerable', SANBI concluded that the above threats were implicit enough to warrant an assessment of 'near threatened' for the Red List of South African Plants. It was first assessed by SANBI for this list in 2009, also as 'near threatened'. In 2005 Bomhard et al. predicted, based on their reading of models projecting the effects of climate change, that many species of Proteaceae would be extinct by 2020, but that P. recondita would have been one of the few species which would expand its distribution. Needless to say, as of 2020, the predictions of Bomhard et al. have proved somewhat inaccurate.

In the past, a very small part of its historic range (4%) was sacrificed to the development of fruit orchards, but agriculture is no longer considered a threat for the survival of the species, because most of the remaining range is within protected areas. Visitors to the Sneeuberg mountain in the Cederberg Wilderness Area can see the species protected in situ.

Although in the south the species grows in dense clumps, the natural habitat fragmentation is especially prevalent in the northern 50% or so of its range, a region spanning a distance of some 70 km (43 mi). This is due to erosion, which will slowly cause this species' habitat to shrink over the next few dozen million years. The ten subpopulations from the Cederberg range and the population on the Piketberg are small, isolated, and furthermore declining for unknown reasons. Five of these subpopulations consist of only a single plant, the Piketberg population consists of two plants, the other five number 3 to 140 individuals.

== See also ==
- List of Protea species
