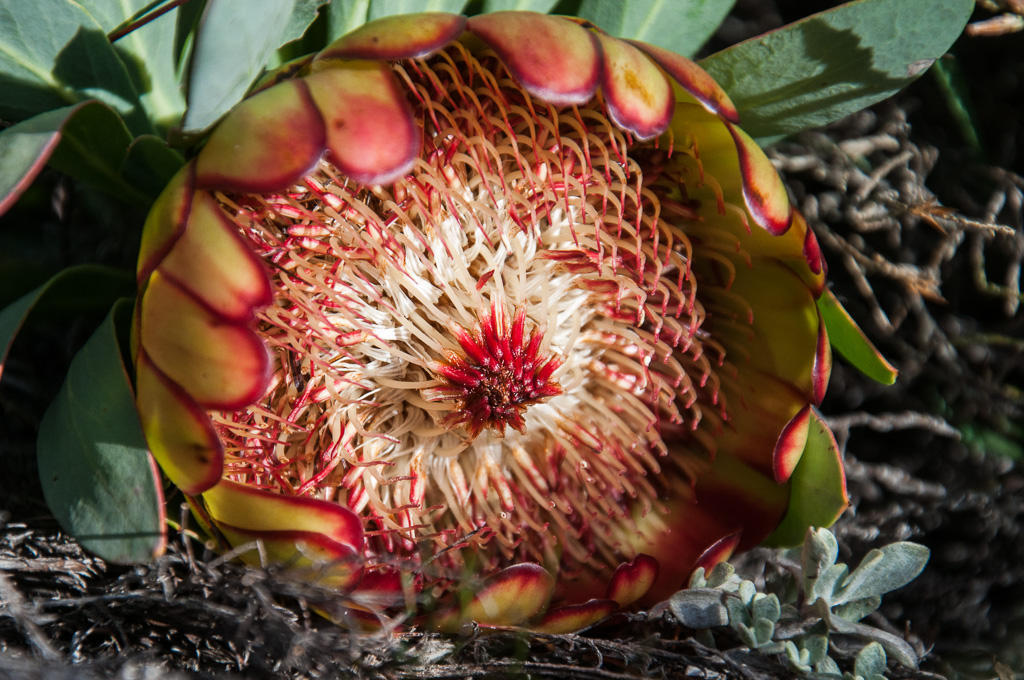
- Scarlet sugarbush (Protea effusa)

Conservation status
- Near Threatened (IUCN 3.1)

Scientific classification
- Kingdom: Plantae
- Clade: Embryophytes
- Clade: Tracheophytes
- Clade: Angiosperms
- Clade: Eudicots
- Order: Proteales
- Family: Proteaceae
- Genus: Protea
- Species: P. effusa

Binomial name
- Protea effusa E.Mey. ex Meisn.

Synonyms
- Scolymocephalus effusus Kuntze; Protea marlothii E.Phillips

= Protea effusa =

Species of flowering plant

Protea effusa, sometimes known as the scarlet sugarbush, is a flowering plant which belongs to the genus Protea. The plant is endemic to the Western Cape province of South Africa. In the Afrikaans language the vernacular name blosrooisuikerbos has been recorded for this plant.

== Taxonomy ==
Protea effusa was first named as an invalid nomina nuda by Ernst Meyer in 1843, but was eventually validated with a proper description by Carl Meissner in 1856 in the Prodromus, initiated by Alphonse Pyramus de Candolle. Meyer used herbarium specimens collected by the German explorer and plant collector Johann Franz Drège as the basis upon which to affix his taxonomic name, which was published in Drège's book Zwei Pflanzengeographische Documente, which summarised (the scientific impressions made on) the journey. Drège collected these specimens, the types, in the Du Toit Mountains near Worcester, Western Cape. According to Edwin Percy Phillips in 1910, Kew may house an isotype specimen collected by Drège, originally sent or traded by Meyer with the herbarium of George Bentham in 1854.

P. marlothii was named by Phillips in 1910 for a population of somewhat more robust plants with larger leaves found growing on the Matroosberg, also in the area of Worcester, which were first collected there by Rudolf Marloth just after the turn of the 19th century.

== Description ==
The branches are glabrous. The leaves are glaucous, distinctly veined, mucronate, end acutely and narrow towards the base. They are usually lanceolate in shape, and 1–2 inches (2.5–5.1 cm) in length. The flower heads are sessile on the stems, 2–3 inches (5.1–7.6 cm) long and 3 inches (7.6 cm) in diameter, and have the shape of a bowl. These appear on the plant in the winter months. The bracts may be greenish-yellow to deep red.

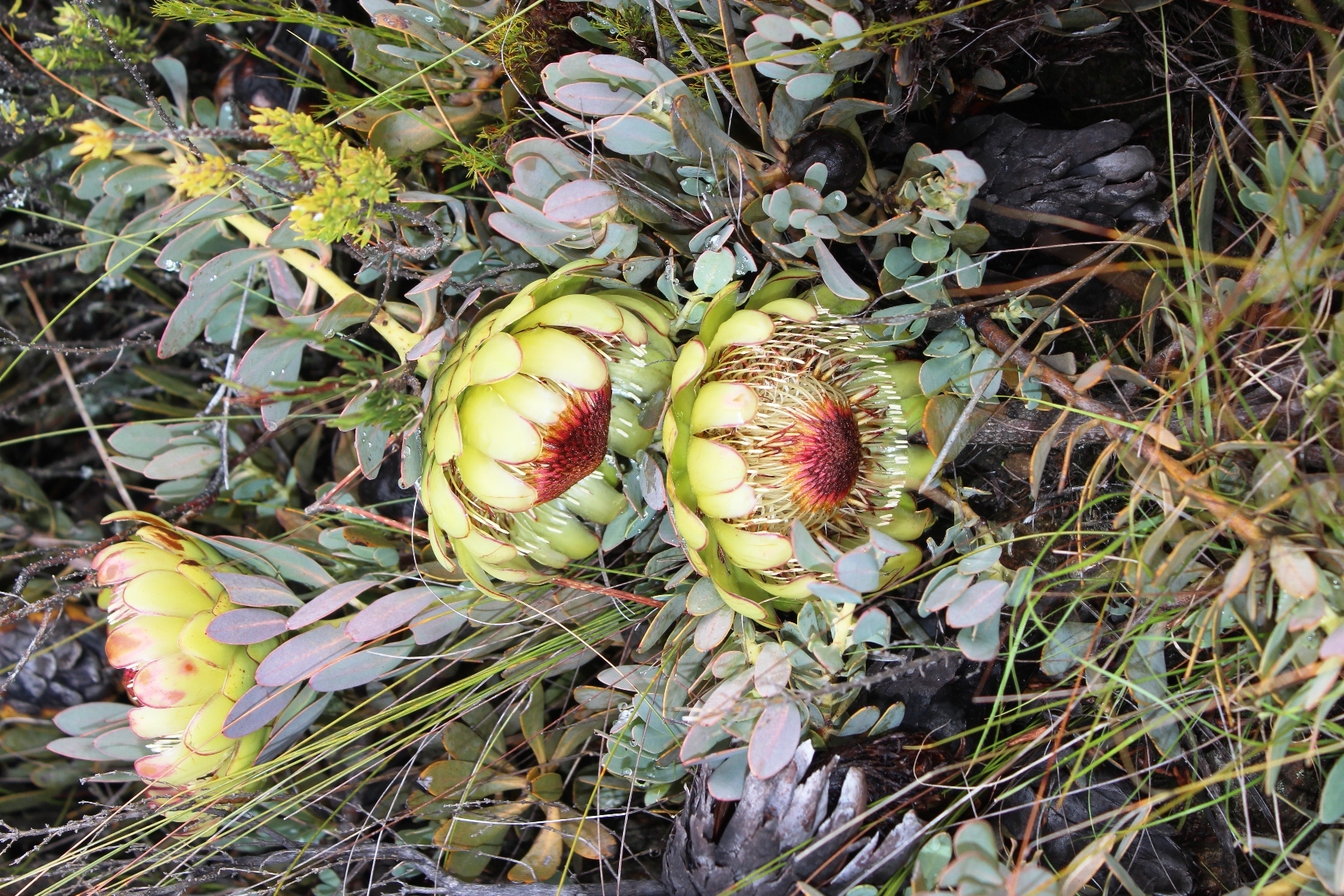
Protea effusa in midwinter on the first of July

=== Variability ===
In cultivation in Australia, the plant can be very variable in appearance, with some forms growing as a ground-hugging, mat-forming, prostrate shrub, and others becoming an erect shrub growing up to 1.5 metres (4.9 ft) in height. The leaves can also be variable, with individual plants having differences in leaf width. The colour of the inflorescences may vary from greenish-bronze to a rich red.

In the wild in South Africa, most populations are of the ground-hugging sort, but populations of taller, erect-growing plants exist at Gydo Pass and across the Gydoberg. These plants are suspected of being natural hybrids with Protea recondita, or perhaps a hybrid of P. recondita crossed with P. pendula, but require further study. Plants on the Matroosberg, the former P. marlothii, have larger, more oblanceolate-shaped leaves than other populations, these grow up to 3 inches (7.6 cm) in length, and in some cases can be twice as broad as those elsewhere. Another difference was said to be slightly larger flower heads, and yellow-brown hairs on the ovary in this form, as well as other tiny details of the inflorescence.

=== Similar species ===
Phillips, in describing P. marlothii, found the most similar species to be P. pendula, and also P. sulphurea, but differing in having the flower heads being erect and opening upwards, as opposed to hanging.

== Distribution ==
It occurs from the Koue Bokkeveld Mountains (such as the Waboomsberg) to the Du Toit Mountains and Naudesberg area of the Western Cape province. Within this area it occurs in the Franschhoek, the Gydoberg, Hex River and Groot Winterhoek mountains.

It almost exclusively grows on mountain summits. Existing populations exhibit a fragmented spatial distribution and are small, over a quarter of the known populations consist of five plants or less. The reason behind such small populations is as yet mysterious. Of the known localities, only 13% bear more than a hundred plants.

== Ecology ==
This is a species found growing on rocky and exposed mountain ridges in an otherwise montane fynbos habitat at the tops of mountains, at altitudes of 1,200 to 1,800 metres. It is pollinated by rodents. Mature individuals are killed by wildfire, but the seeds can survive such an event, being stored in the fire-resistant dried old inflorescences. The seeds are released after fires, and dispersed by means of the wind.

== Horticulture ==
Cultivation of this species is not always easy, the collection locality from which a particular batch of plants originates may play a large part in determining how it will grow. It prefers a cool and dry climate, being native to mountainous regions of the Cape Region. It is best grown in well-drained soils. The flower heads have successfully been used as cut flowers.

== Conservation ==
In 2009 the South African National Biodiversity Institute (SANBI) assessed the conservation status of the species as being 'near threatened'. In 2011 they reaffirmed this judgement, basing this on a suspected larger former population, based itself on the small extant populations.

Although SANBI states that there is no evidence that the population is declining, they judge that the population is decreasing or will decrease in the future, giving as main reason climate change. It is feared that the development of fruit orchards on the Gydoberg is ongoing habitat loss for the plants found there, but this only a single subpopulation. It is furthermore suspected that the populations on the Hex River and Groot Winterhoek mountains are being subjected to too frequent wildfires. However, any possible future population reduction is not expected to exceed 30%, the amount in percentage of population per generation, to warrant a more dire conservation status. The pattern of distribution suggests a much wider range in the past, but why, when or how it became restricted to such small isolated fragments is unknown.

The species is protected in the nature reserves of Groot Winterhoek Wilderness Area, Fonteintjiesberg, Haweqwa, Theewaterskloof, Wittebrug, Witzenberg and Patryskloof.

== See also ==
- List of Southern African indigenous trees and woody lianes
- List of Protea species
