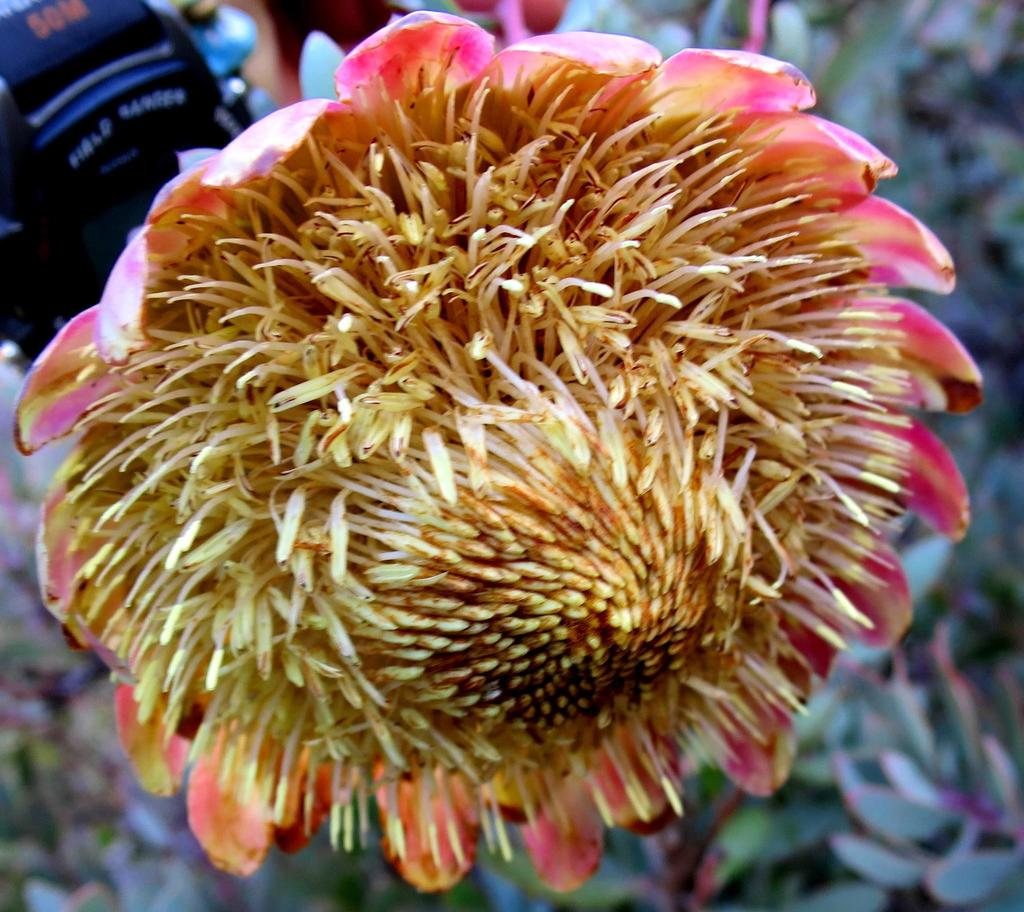
- Protea sulphurea in South Africa

Conservation status
- Least Concern (IUCN 3.1)

Scientific classification
- Kingdom: Plantae
- Clade: Embryophytes
- Clade: Tracheophytes
- Clade: Angiosperms
- Clade: Eudicots
- Order: Proteales
- Family: Proteaceae
- Genus: Protea
- Species: P. sulphurea

Binomial name
- Protea sulphurea E.Phillips

= Protea sulphurea =

Species of flowering plant

Protea sulphurea, also known as the sulphur sugarbush, is a flowering plant of the genus Protea in the family Proteaceae, which is only known to grow in the wild in the Western Cape province of South Africa. A vernacular name for the plant in the Afrikaans language is heuningkoeksuikerbos or Skaamblom (shy flower) .

== Taxonomy ==
Protea sulphurea was first described by Edwin Percy Phillips in 1910. A type series (#3208) was originally collected by the German explorer Rudolf Marloth in 1903; there are at least three specimen sheets labelled as Marloth3208 housed at the Kew Herbarium. Another, possibly older, specimen was also collected by one Pearson (perhaps Thomas Pearson Stokoe), who was possibly the first European to collect this species. Phillips gives neither a type for the taxon, nor an etymology for the specific epithet. Otto Stapf designated the Pearson collection as the holotype in 1912, but in 1972 John Patrick Rourke overturned this for some reason, and selected one of the three sheets of Marloth's collections at Kew as the lectotype.

== Description ==
This species grows into a low, squat, woody, densely-branched shrub up to 0.5 1.8 or 2 m tall. The branches are glabrous. The leaves are glaucous (or yellowish when dry or during droughts), indistinctly veined, minutely rugulose (having a finely wrinkled surface and texture), 2–3 centimetres (0.79–1.18 in) long, and 6 to 13 mm broad. Their shape is either narrowly obovate-cuneate or oblanceolate.

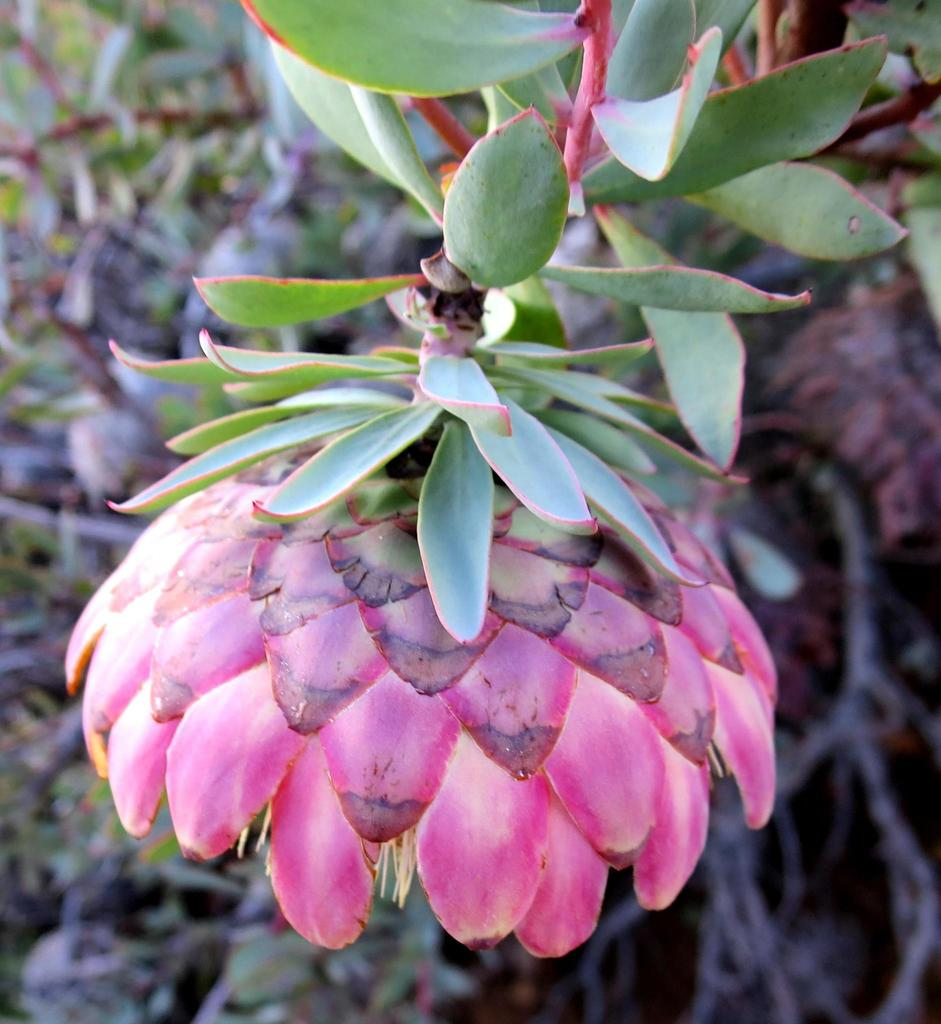
Protea sulphurea flower heads are pendulous; they hang upside down. The brightly-coloured involucral bracts are visible in this photograph.

The flowers are produced from April to August, densely packed together within large inflorescences. These inflorescences, or more specifically pseudanthia (also called 'flower heads'), are almost sessile (having a very short and indistinct peduncle), and hang downwards towards the ground. They have a 2.5 centimetres (0.98 in) long receptacles which are conical in shape. The flower head is surrounded by petal-like structures called 'involucral bracts', these are glabrous and arranged in a series of nine or ten rows. The outer bracts have somewhat pointy ends, ovate in shape and minutely ciliate (having a fringe of hairs like an eyelash at their margins). The inner bracts are oblong or spathulate-oblong in shape, and are longer than the actual flowers. It is monoecious, both sexes occur in each flower. The petals and sepals of the flowers are fused into a tube-like, 2.3 centimetres (0.91 in) long perianth-sheath. This sheath is dilated, has three keels and six to seven veins on the lower portion, has an 8.5 mm lip, and generally glabrous except for a few setose (bristly, stiff) hairs from the base to near the upper parts of the outer surface. The lip is slightly recurved, has a few scattered setose hairs on it, and has three teeth at its end. The two outer of these teeth are longer than the middle one, at 1.4 mm long versus 1 mm. All of the stamens are fertile. Their filaments are 0.53 mm long and channelled. The anthers are linear and 4.8 mm long. The apical glands are 0.35 mm in length, ovate in shape and end in an acute point. There are oblong and obtuse (blunt) hypogynous scales which are 1.4 mm in length. The ovary is covered in long, spreading, yellow-brown hairs. The style is 2.65 mm long, falcate, compressed, glabrous and tapers towards both ends. The stigma is 5.3 mm long, with an obtuse end, grooved, and almost imperceptibly becomes the style.

=== Similar species ===
It is similar to Protea effusa, primarily differing in having conically-shaped receptacles within the inflorescence, and also to P. pendula, from which it differs by having wider leaves with indistinct venation.

== Distribution ==
The plant is endemic to the Western Cape province of South Africa. It is found distributed from the Hex River Mountains, through the Witteberg Mountains, to the Swartberg mountains and the Waboomsberg, which is one of the Koue Bokkeveld Mountains. It occurs near the town of Matjiesfontein.

== Gallery ==
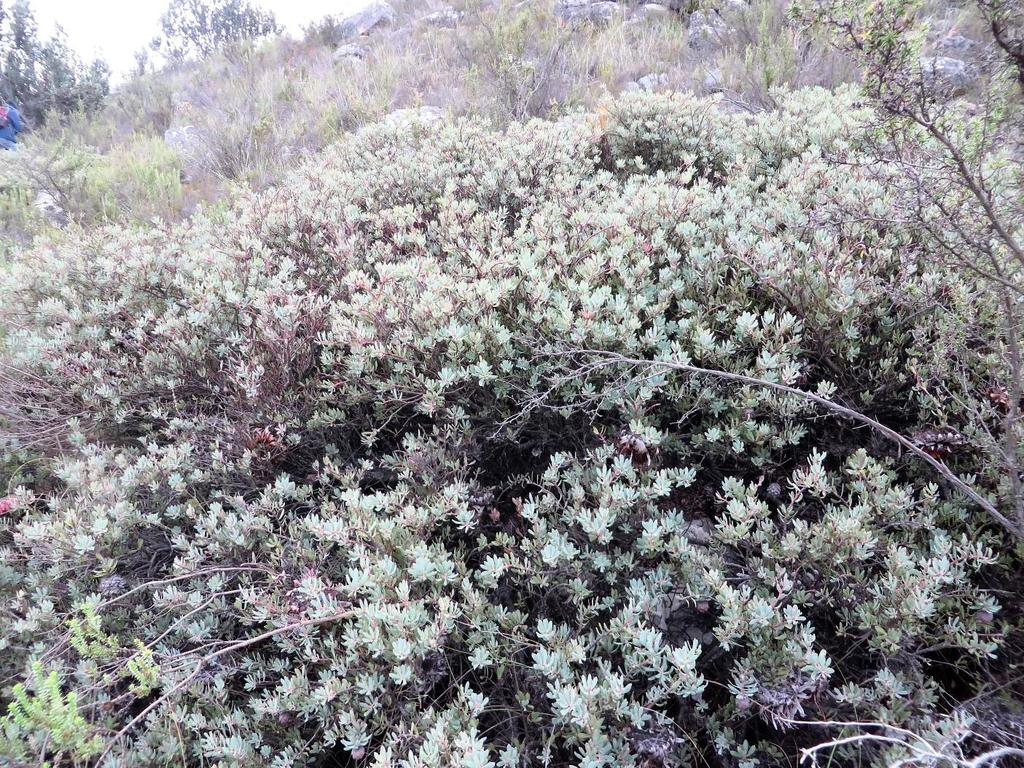
Protea sulphurea bush

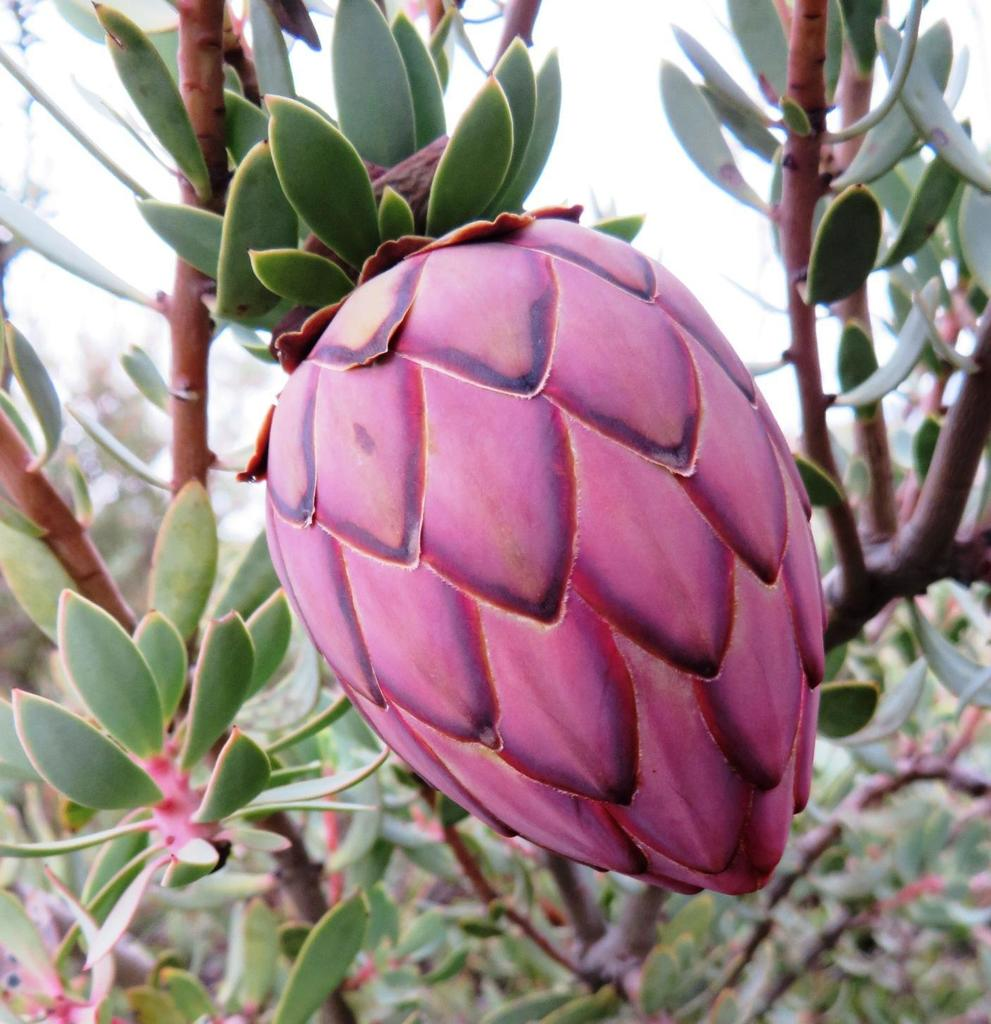
Protea sulphurea flower head

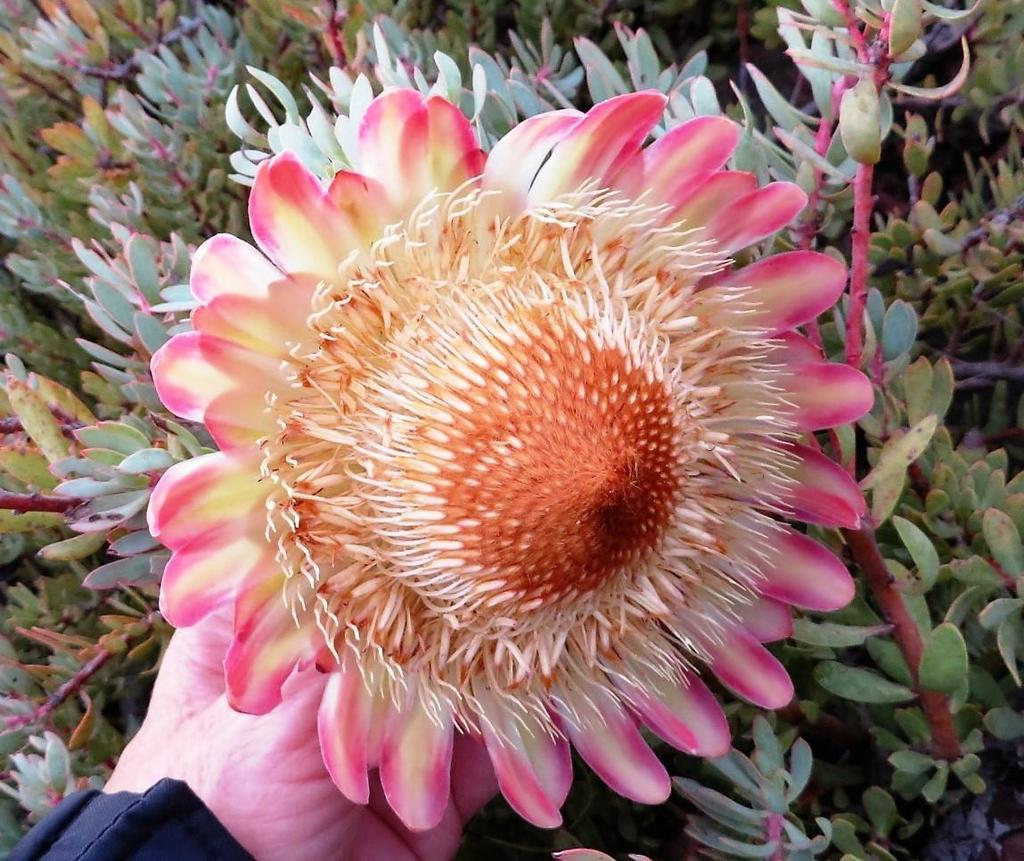
Protea sulphurea flower head

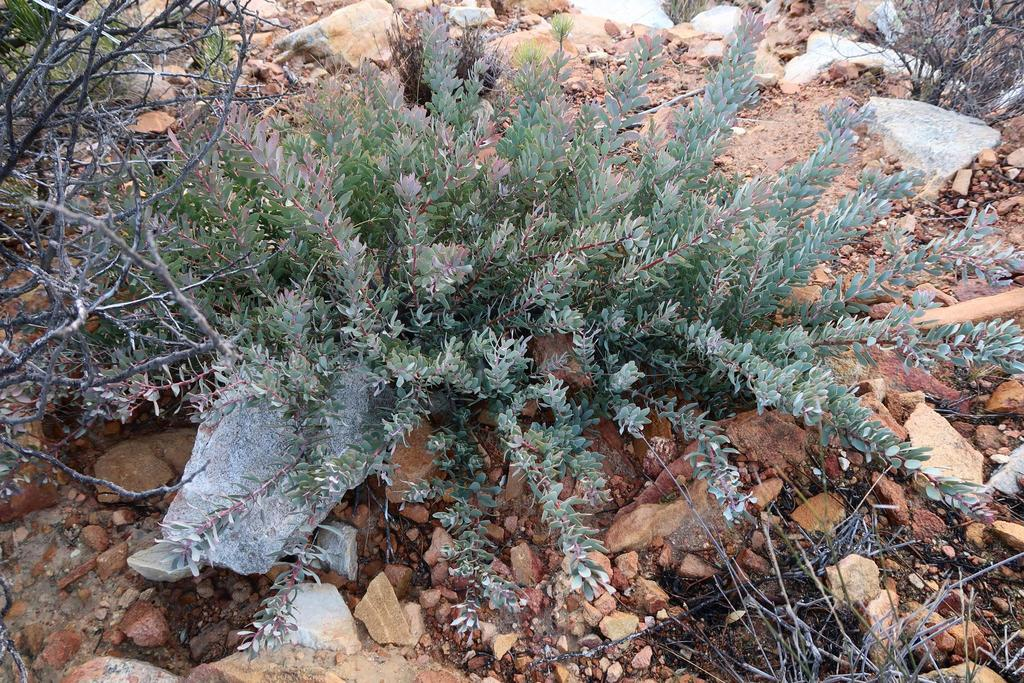
Protea sulphurea bush

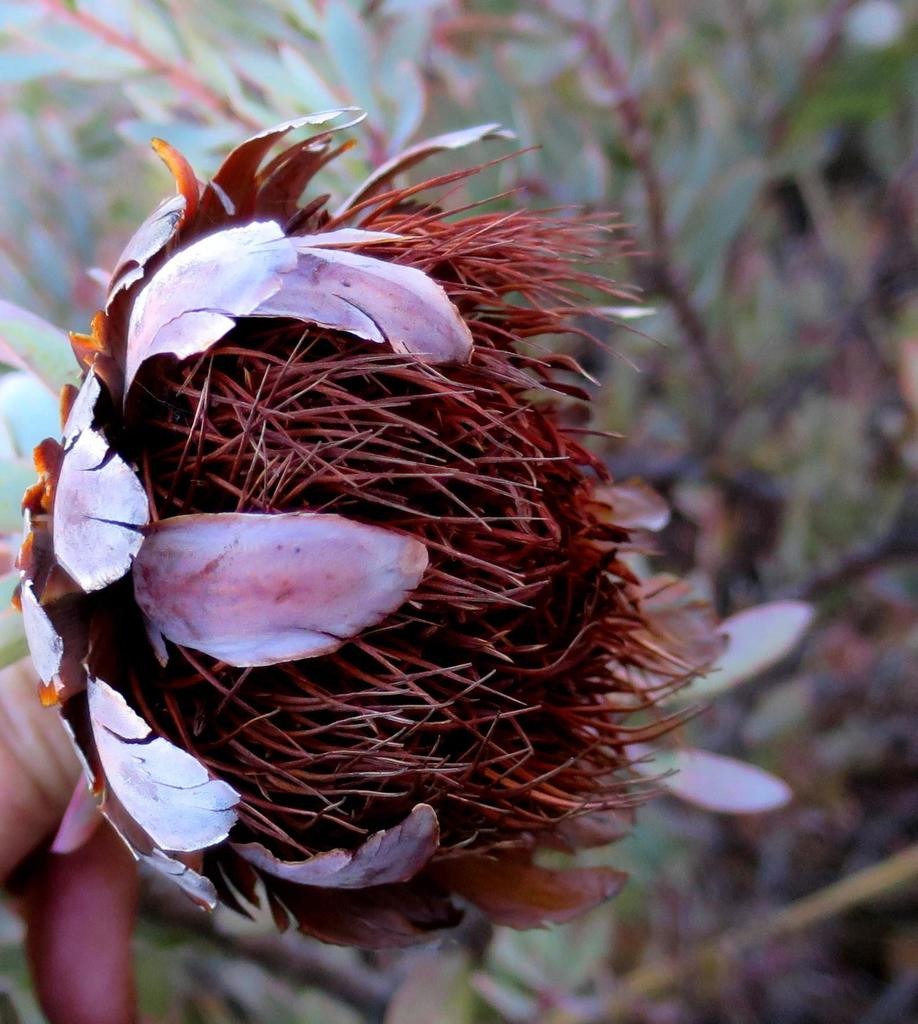
Protea sulphurea flower head

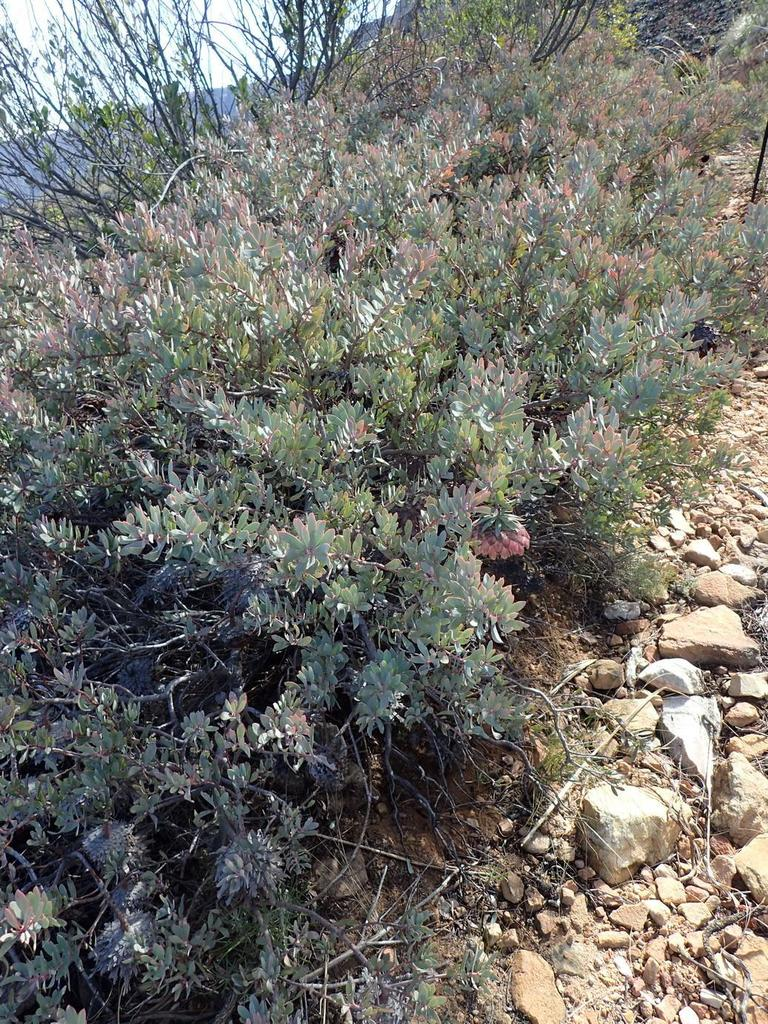
Protea sulphurea bush

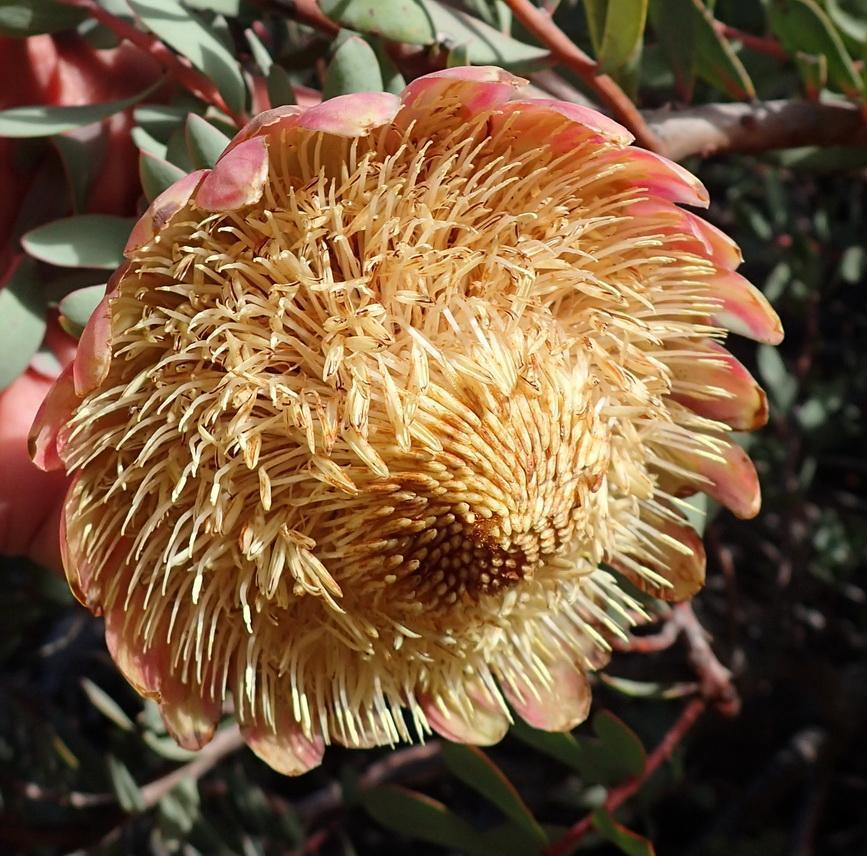
Protea sulphurea flower head

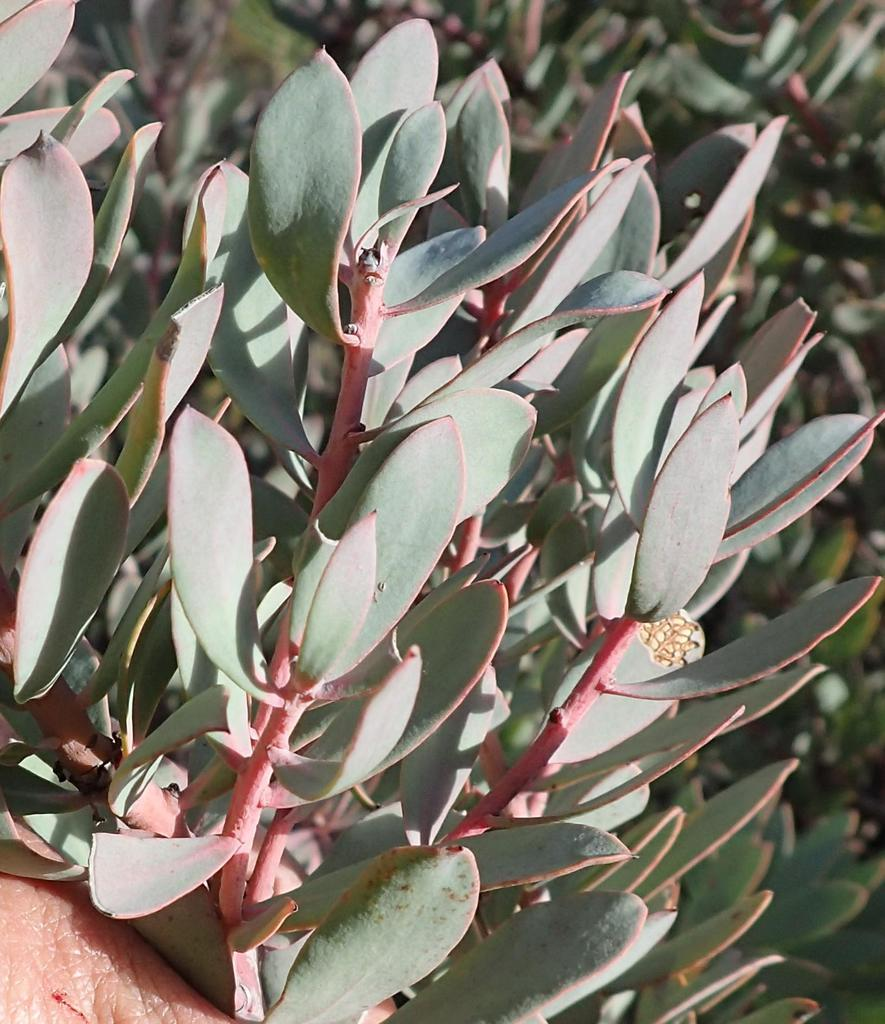
Protea sulphurea bush

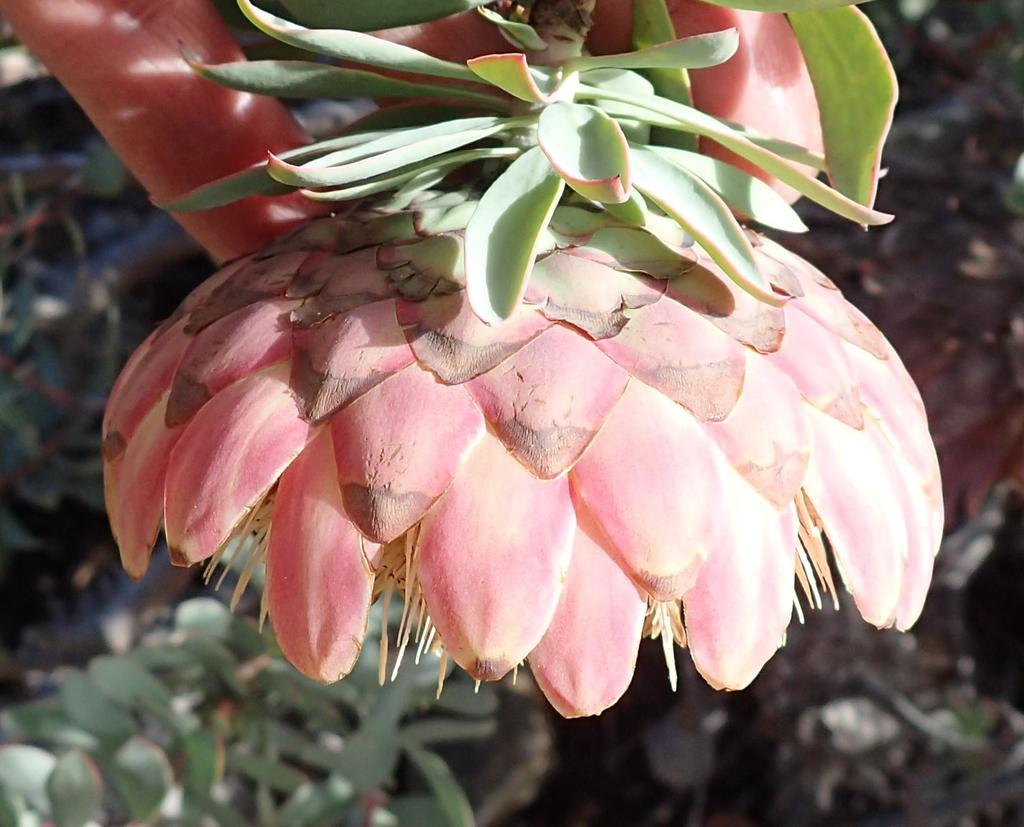
Protea sulphurea flower head

== Ecology ==
Mature plants are killed in the periodic wildfires which sweep its habitat, but the seeds can survive such occasions. It flowers in the Autumn and Winter, from April to August. The flowers are pollinated by birds and small non-flying mammals. Small mammal pollinators include Micaelamys namaquensis and Elephantulus edwardii. The fruits may be retained for a few years. Seeds are stored in seed heads on the plant and dispersed by means of the wind.

=== Habitat ===
It is found in arid areas, in a habitat which is most commonly fynbos, although near the town of Matjiesfontein it also grows in renosterveld in a shale-derived soil, as well as in the shale fynbos in that area. It is usually found growing in sandstone-derived soils, although a few populations, all found around Matjiesfontein, also grow here in a quartzite-derived substrate and the aforementioned shale. It is found at between 1,000 and 1,550 metres (3,280 and 5,090 ft) in altitude.

== Conservation ==
This species is not threatened. The state of the population numbers is considered stable. In 2009 the South African National Biodiversity Institute first assessed this species to have the conservation status of 'least concern', an opinion that was reiterated by the institute in 2019.

== See also ==
- List of Protea species
