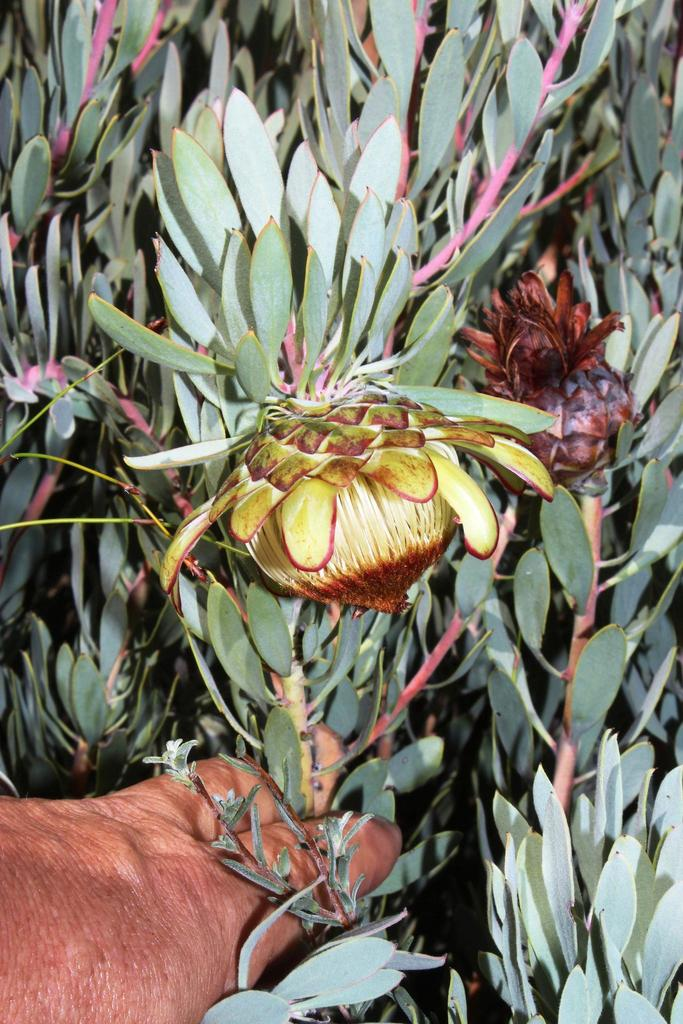
- Protea pendula in South Africa

Conservation status
- Least Concern (IUCN 3.1)

Scientific classification
- Kingdom: Plantae
- Clade: Embryophytes
- Clade: Tracheophytes
- Clade: Angiosperms
- Clade: Eudicots
- Order: Proteales
- Family: Proteaceae
- Genus: Protea
- Species: P. pendula

Binomial name
- Protea pendula R.Br.

Synonyms
- Scolymocephalus pendulus Kuntze

= Protea pendula =

Species of flowering plant

Protea pendula, also known as the nodding sugarbush or arid sugarbush, is a flowering plant of the genus Protea, in the family Proteaceae, which is only found growing in the wild in the Cape Region of South Africa. In the Afrikaans language it is known as knikkopsuikerbossie or ondersteboknopprotea.

== Taxonomy ==
Protea pendula was first described by Robert Brown in his 1810 treatise On the Proteaceae of Jussieu.

The holotype is an exsiccata collection made by Francis Masson in the early 1770s in an unspecified location in South Africa. There is an isotype in the herbarium assembled by William Forsyth, which is now held at Kew. The species was collected again in 1831 by Karl Ludwig Philipp Zeyher (accompanied by Christian Friedrich Ecklon) in the Witzenberg Mountains to the east of the town of Tulbagh.

== Description ==
This plant grows as an erect shrub up to three metres tall. The younger branches are softly hirsute, eventually becoming glabrous with age. The leaves are glaucous, distinctly veined beneath, 0.75–1.75 inches (1.9–4.4 cm) in length, and approximately 0.5 cm in width. They are shaped narrowly-oblanceolate, ending in an acute apex with a mucronate tip. Young leaves are covered in a very minute, loose pubescence, but become glabrous as they get older.

The flowers are bourne on a specialised inflorescence, a flower head or pseudanthium. The flower head is sessile, 1.5 inches (3.8 cm) in length, and around 1.5 inches (3.8 cm) in diameter. The flower heads are dropping, opening downwards. It is monoecious, with both sexes occurring in each flower. The inflorescences are produced in the late autumn to winter, mostly in May to June, extending to August. There are seven to eight series of involucral bracts. The outer bracts are often coloured a dull, mealy red, are shaped ovate to subacuminate (somewhat pointy), with an obtuse apex, and covered in silky-pubescent or tomentose hairs on their lower halves. Their margins are membranous and ciliate (fringed with hairs). The inner bracts are longer than the actual flowers and are shaped obtuse, in-curved at their tops, slightly concave and covered in minute pubescent hairs on their outsides. The petals and sepals of the flowers are fused into a 19mm long perianth-sheath. This sheath is dilated, having three keels and three veins at its base, and reddish, pilose hairs on the outside of the very top of the sheath, where it has a 5mm long lip with the underside covered in a few, stiff, setose (bristly) hairs of a reddish colour. The lip is three-toothed, with each tooth almost equal in length, 0.7mm. All of the stamens are fertile. The anthers are linear and 2.6mm long. The apical glands are ovate and somewhat less than 0.3mm in length. The ovary is oblong and covered in long, reddish-brown hairs. The style is glabrous, compressed, curved to falcate in shape and some 21.2mm long. It is obliquely dilated above the ovary, then gradually tapering. The stigma is 3.2mm long, thread-like in shape, obtuse, and almost imperceptibly becomes the style.

=== Similar species ===
It is similar to Protea effusa, as well as P. sulphurea, from which it differs by having narrower leaves with more distinct venation. It is also somewhat similar to P. witzenbergiana, differing from that species in having long, foliaceous, leaf-like, outer involucral bracts.

== Distribution ==
Protea pendula is endemic to the Western Cape province of South Africa. It occurs in isolated, scattered populations from the Cedarberg Mountains, such as on the Wolfberg, to the Koue Bokkeveld Mountains, such as on the Waboomsberg.

== Ecology ==
The adult plants are killed by wildfires, but the seeds can survive such an event. The flowers are pollinated by birds. The fruits are numerous, studding the base of the dried, old flower head, which itself remains attached to the plant after senescence. The seeds are retained in the fruits for a few years, until they are eventually dispersed by the wind.

=== Habitat ===
It exclusively grows in a fynbos habitat, in a range of between 1,000 and 2,000 metres (3,300 and 6,600 ft) in altitude. Within such lands it grows in arid, rocky areas, and on krantzes (crags or cliffs).

== Gallery ==
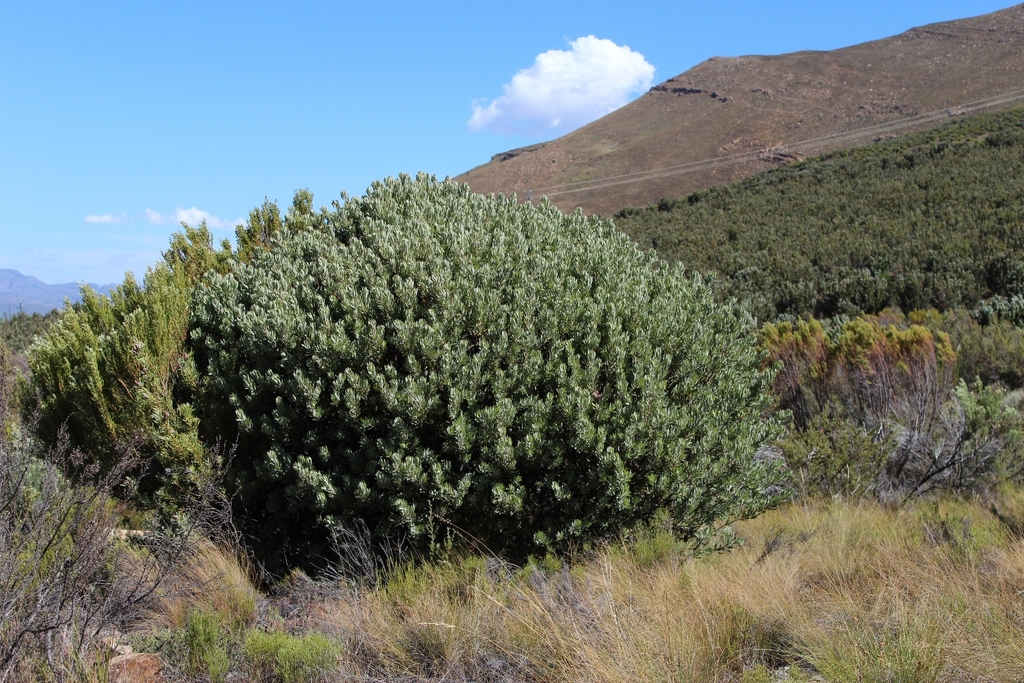
Protea pendula bush

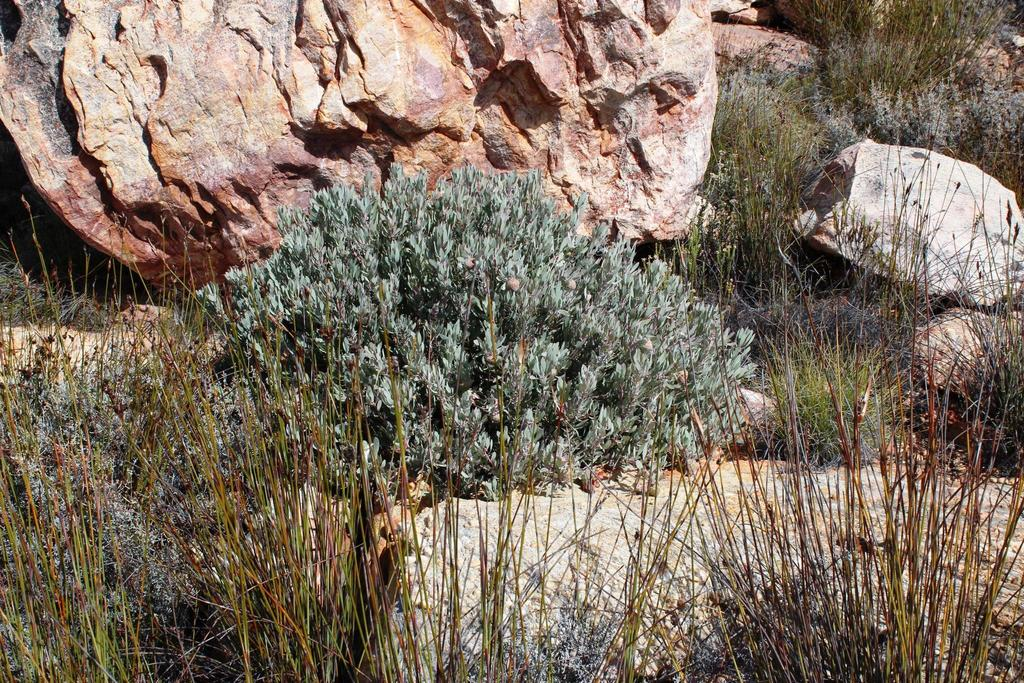
Protea pendula

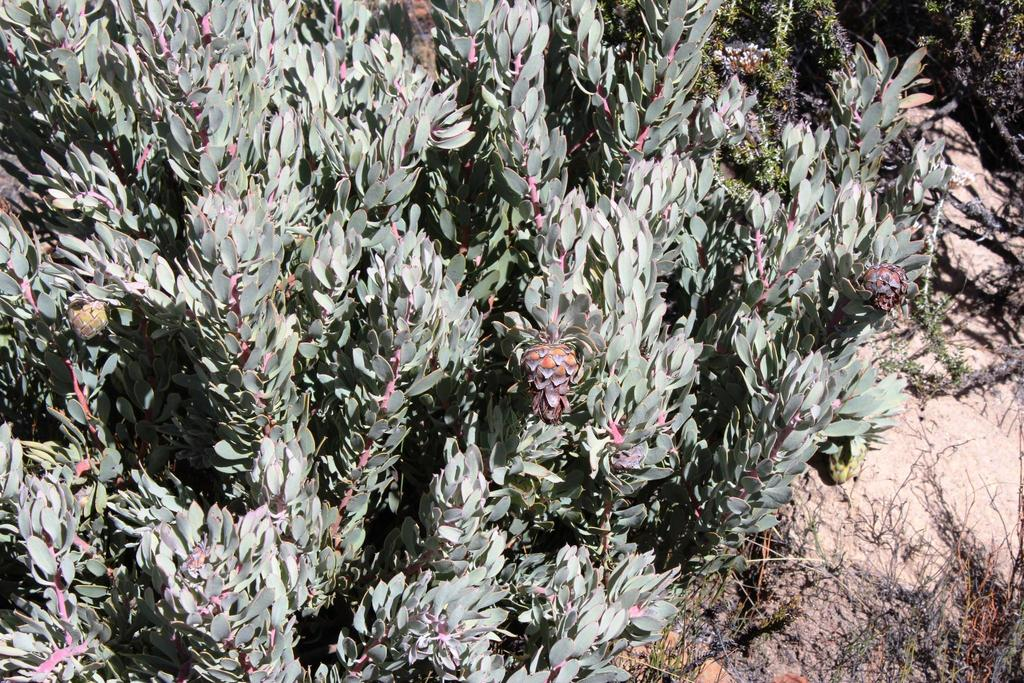
Protea pendula

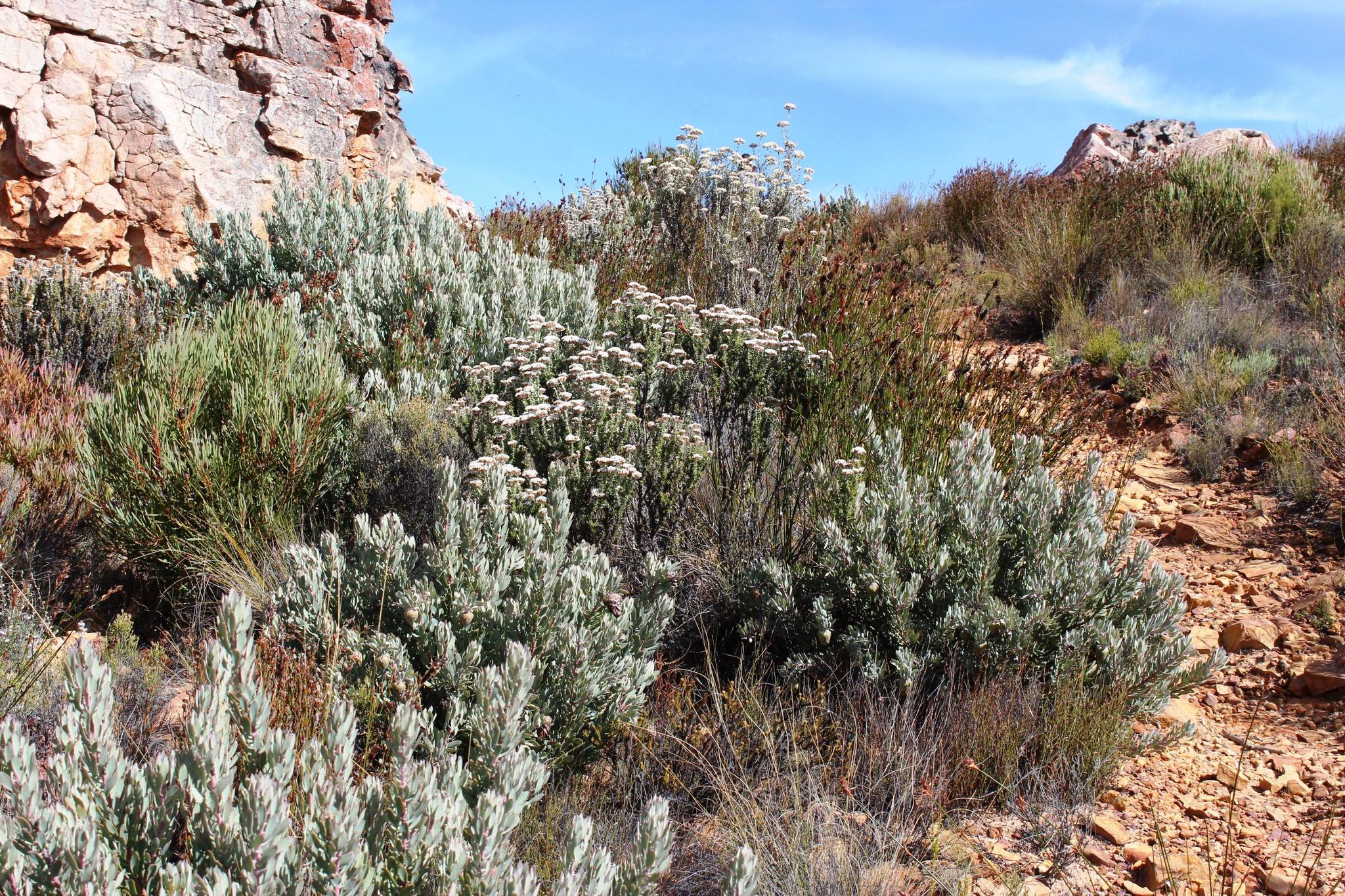
Protea pendula

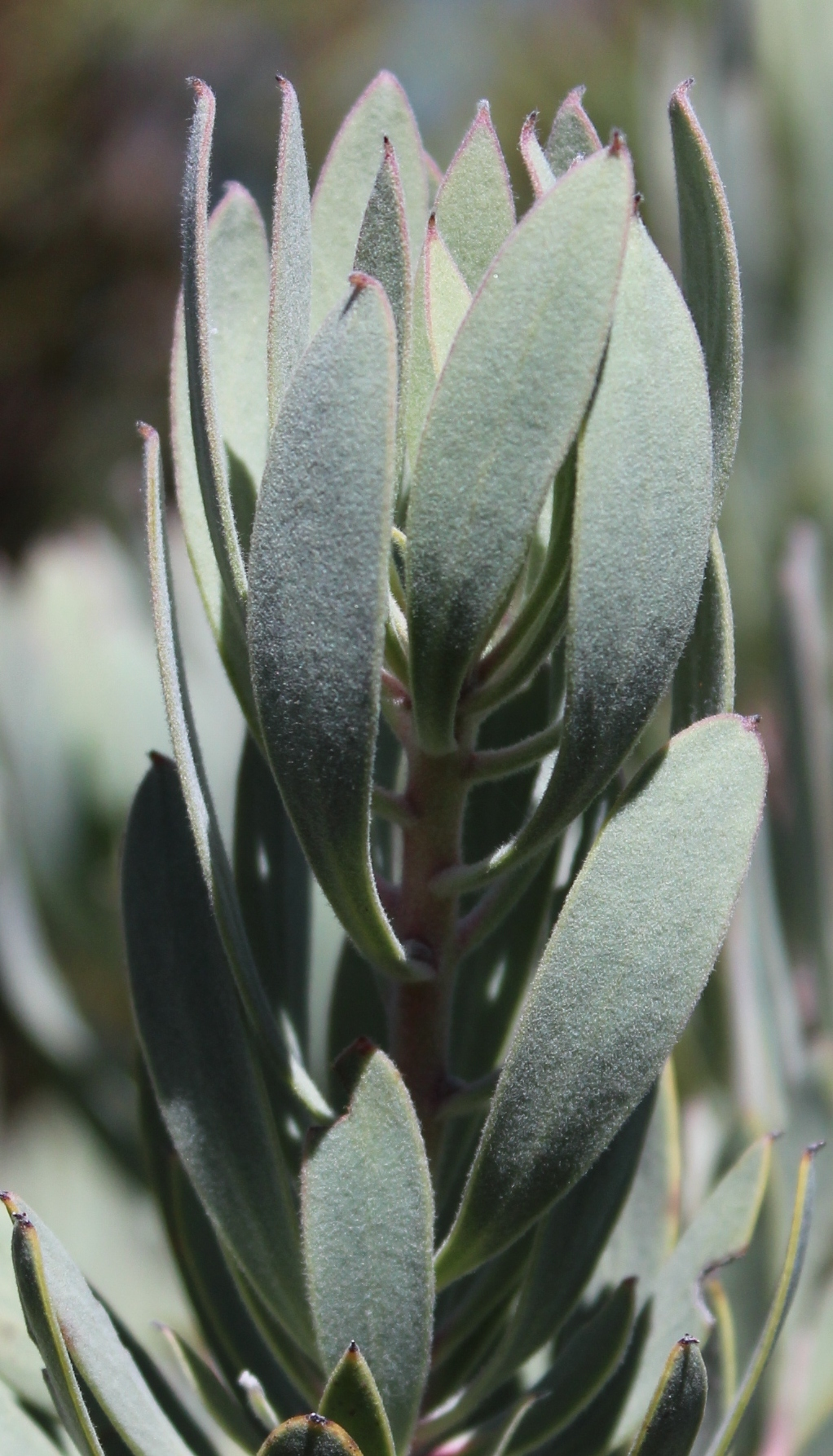
Protea pendula leaves

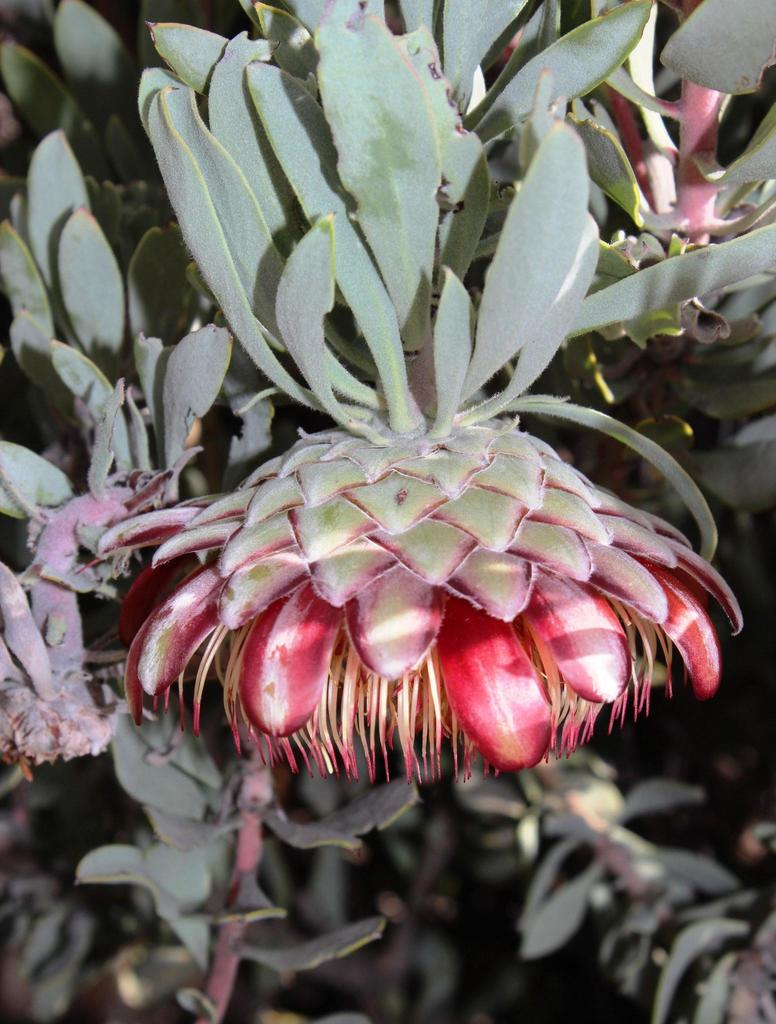
Flower of Protea pendula

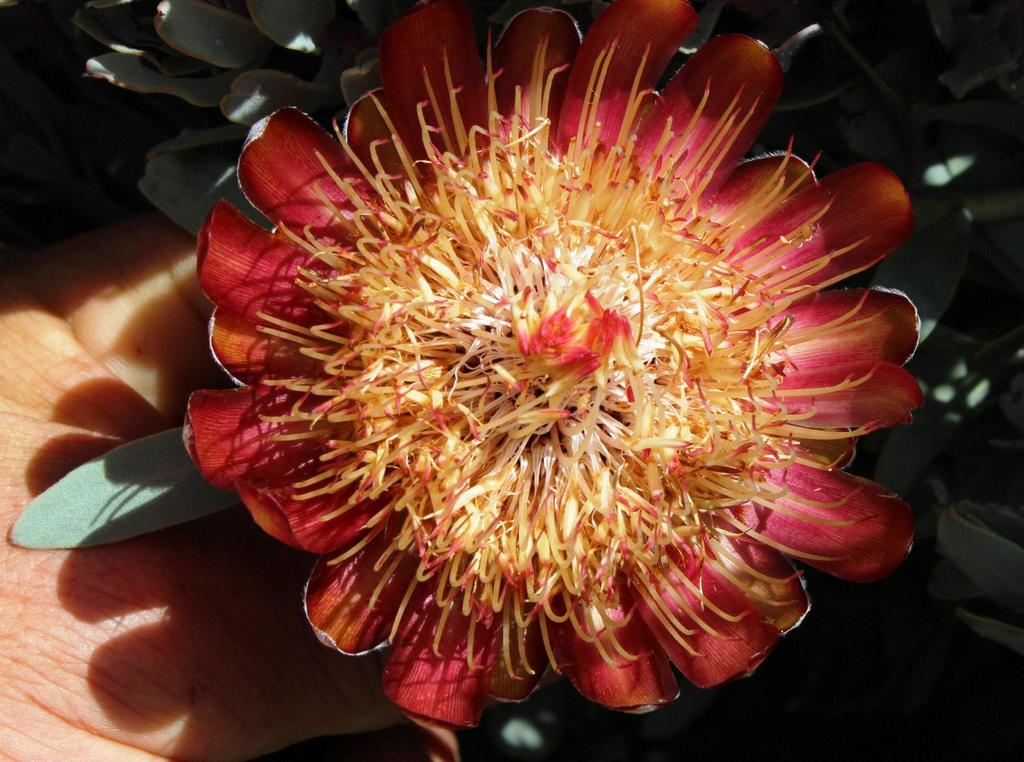
Flower of Protea pendula

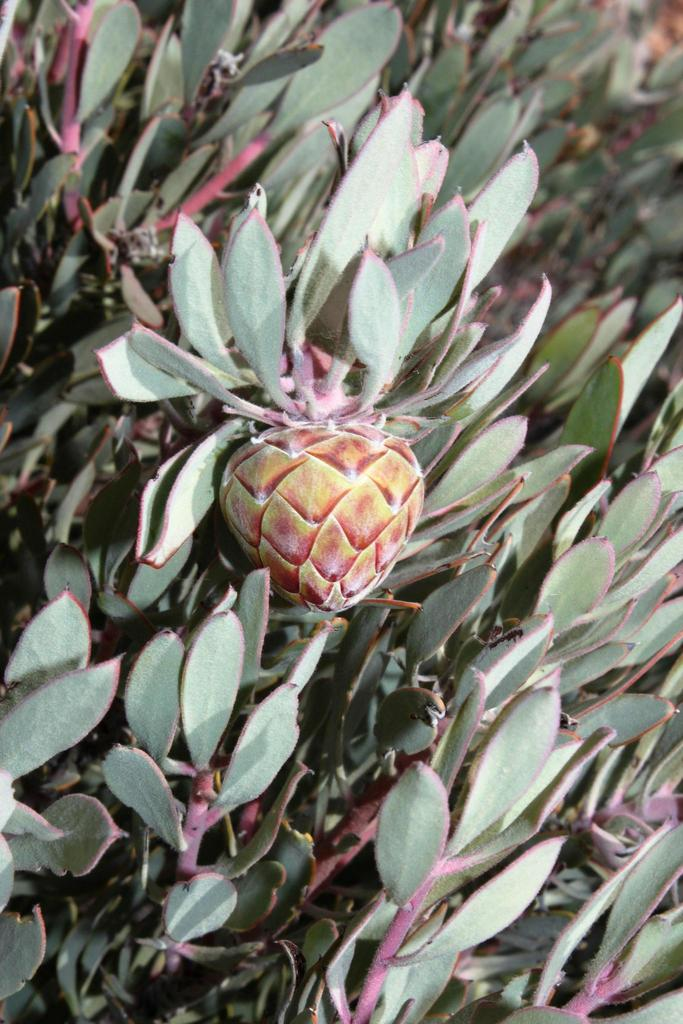
Flower of Protea pendula

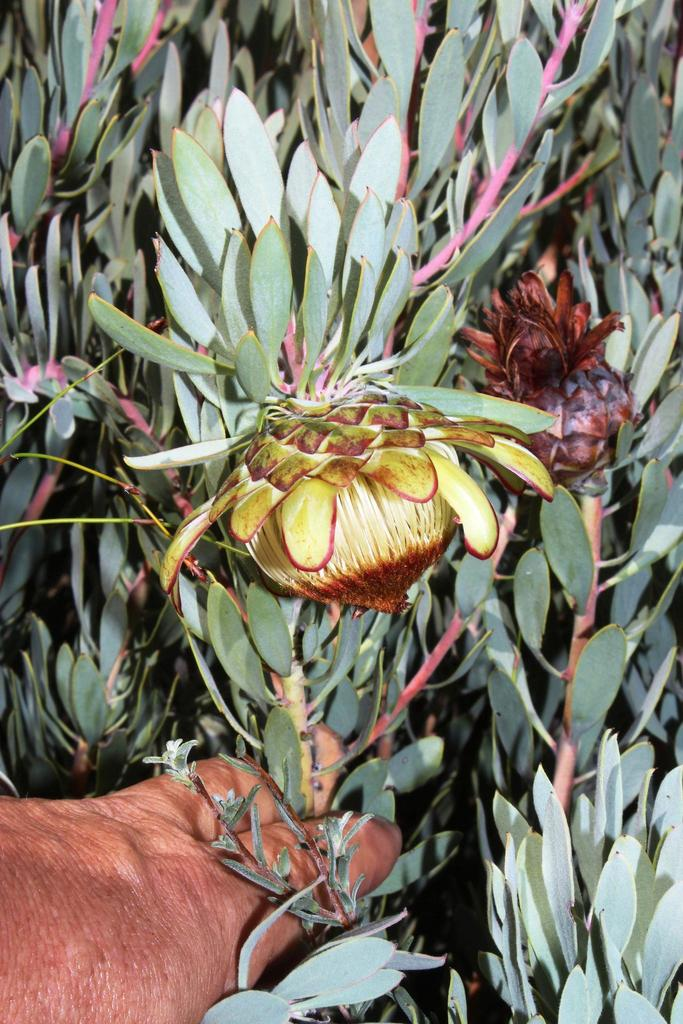
Flower of Protea pendula

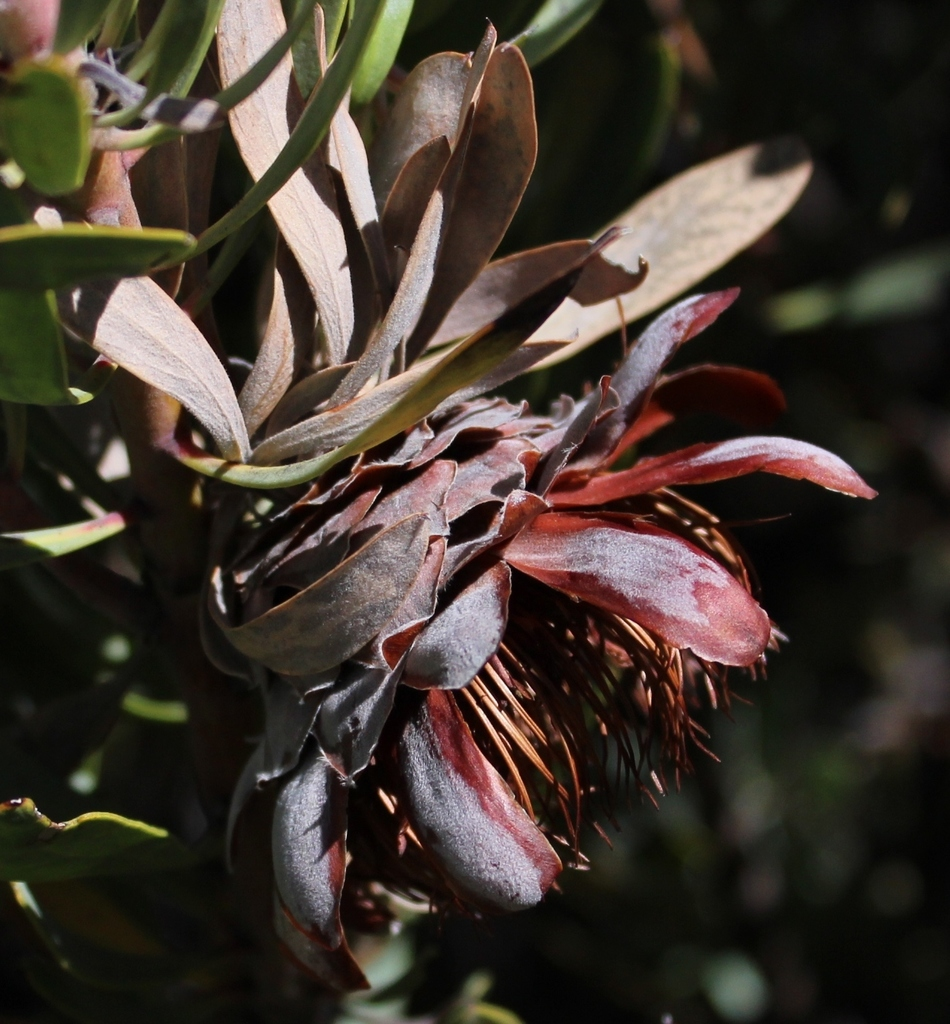
Protea pendula flower

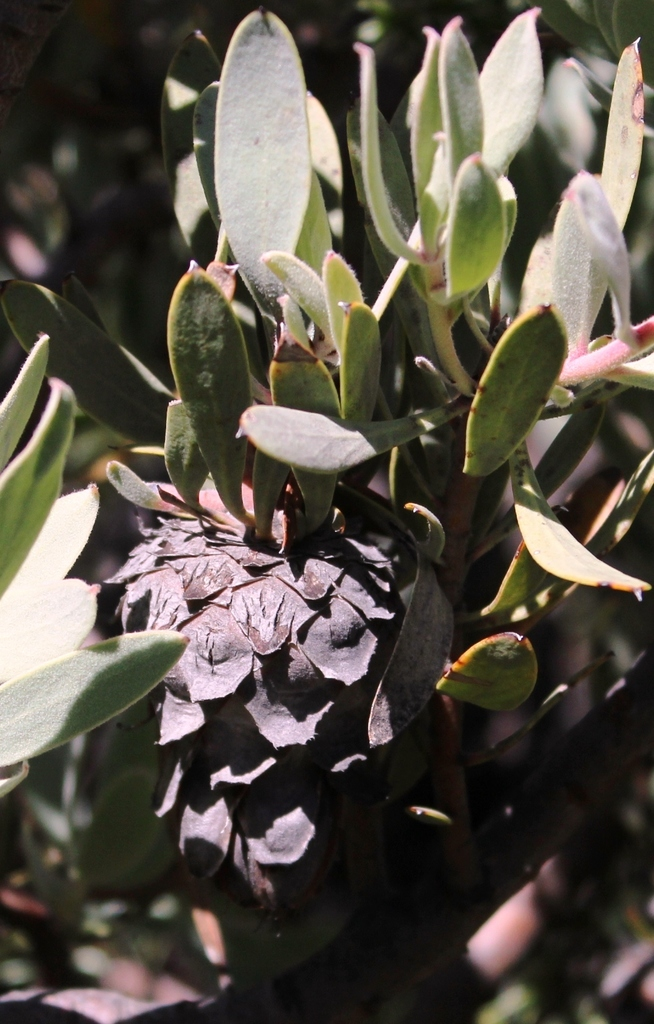
Protea pendula flower

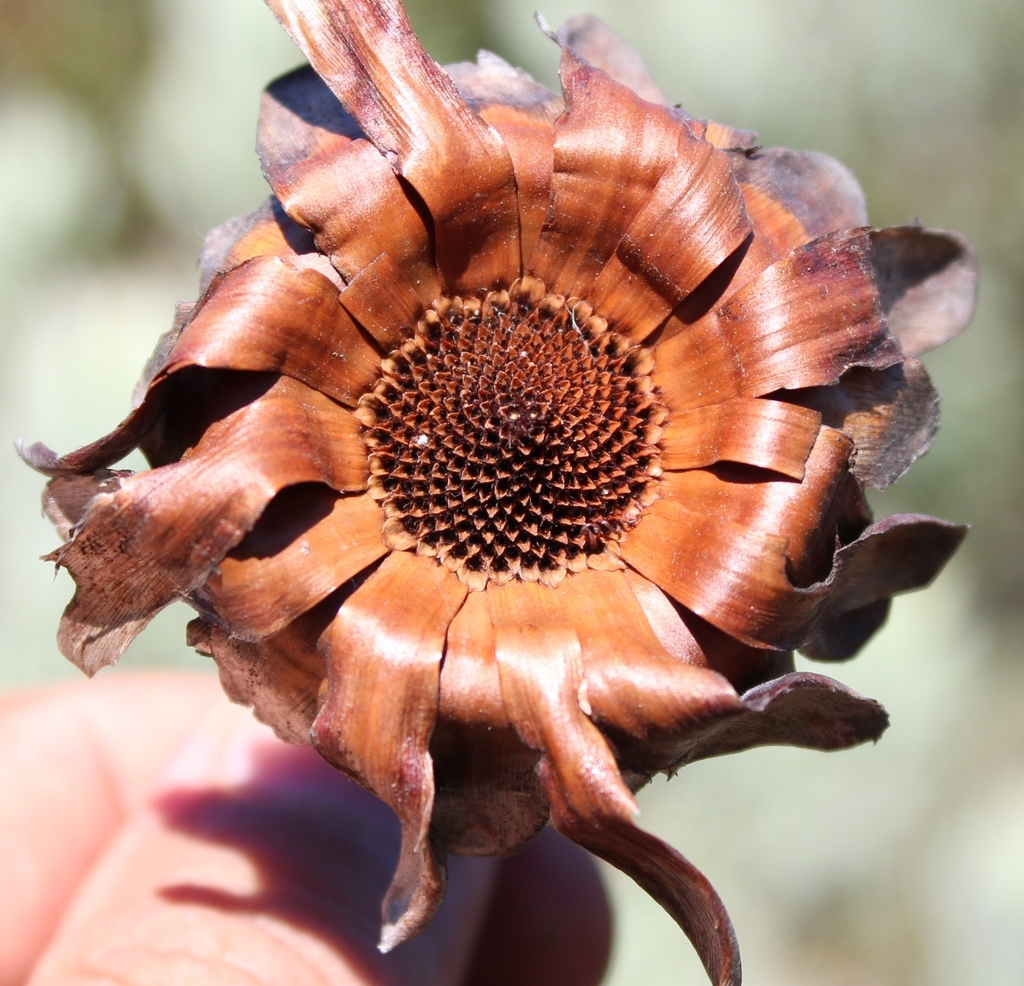
Protea pendula seedhead

== Conservation ==
The rate of change in population is believed to be stable. The conservation status this species was first assessed as 'least concern' by the South African National Biodiversity Institute (SANBI) in 2009. In 2019 another group of authors re-assessed it for SANBI as 'least concern' again.

== See also ==
- List of Protea species
