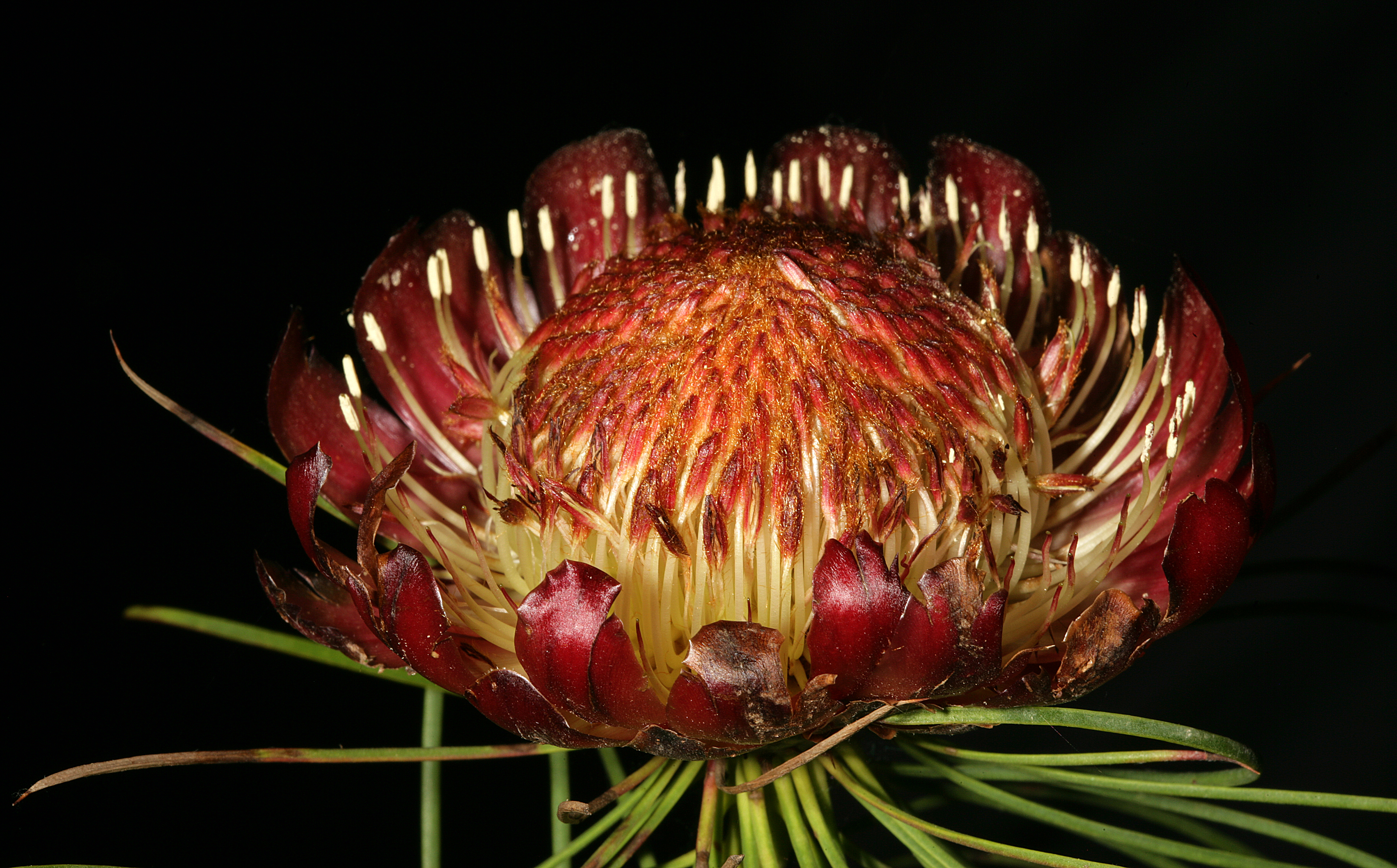
- Protea pityphylla in South Africa.

Conservation status
- Near Threatened (IUCN 3.1)

Scientific classification
- Kingdom: Plantae
- Clade: Embryophytes
- Clade: Tracheophytes
- Clade: Angiosperms
- Clade: Eudicots
- Order: Proteales
- Family: Proteaceae
- Genus: Protea
- Species: P. pityphylla

Binomial name
- Protea pityphylla E.Phillips

= Protea pityphylla =

Species of flowering plant

Protea pityphylla, also known as Ceres sugarbush or mountain rose (along with a number of similar species), is a flowering shrub of the genus Protea, in the family Proteaceae. The plant is endemic to the southwestern Cape Region of South Africa.

== Names ==
In the Afrikaans language the vernacular names hekskaamblom and less specifically skaamblom have been recorded for this plant, skaamblom being a name it shares with other similar proteas. The name skaamblom translates as 'shy' or 'bashful' flower, and possibly refers to the nodding, downward-pointing inflorescences. It was first attested in the 1929 article titled Gewone Plantname in die Distrik Riversdal by Muir in Die Huisgenoot for the species Protea nana.

== Taxonomy ==
Protea pityphylla was first described by Edwin Percy Phillips in 1910. It was collected 27 years earlier, in 1883, by the British botanist A. A. Bodkin (collection #6089) at an elevation of 549 metres on the Michell's Pass through the Skurweberge. When his collections were studied at the Bolus Herbarium, they were first identified as 'Protea cf. canaliculata (in 1886), until Phillips recognised it as a new species. Phillips neglected to supply a clear type for any of the species he described in 1910, but in 1912 Otto Stapf designated three sets of specimens to typify Phillips' new species: the Bodkin collection and two collections by Peter MacOwan made at the same locality, including one in his personal herbarium (#2907). Syntypes of Bodkin's original collections are housed at the herbarium at Kew and the Bolus Herbarium. MacOwan also exchanged specimen sheets to herbaria around the world with his Herbarium Normale Austro–Africanum series, which he used to build up the collection of the Government Herbarium at Cape Town. One of the sheets in this series, #913, is a collection of this species from the same Pass collected by MacOwan likely sometime in the late 1880s, was also used by Phillips, and designated as a syntype by Stapf -albeit that there were copies in many herbaria.

P. pityphylla was classified in Protea section Pinifolia by Tony Rebelo in 1995, what he calls the "rose sugarbushes", along with P. acuminata, P. canaliculata, P. nana, P. scolymocephala and P. witzenbergiana.

== Description ==
This plant is a shrub which can grow to become up to 1 metre (3.3 ft) in height, which can grow with either somewhat erect branches or branches which have a more sprawling form. The stems are glabrous. Plants can flower from about five years of age.

The leaves are linear and needle-like, ending in a piercingly sharp point. They point upwards (are ascending) and/or secund. The leaves are 1mm wide and 4–9 centimetres (1.6–3.5 in) in length, glabrous, slightly grooved or channelled, and bright green in colour. The top side of the leaf is minutely, but prominently, ribbed (costate).

It blooms in the early winter, with the peak in May to July, but potentially from May to September. The inflorescences are specialised structures called pseudanthia, also known simply as flower heads, containing hundred of reduced flowers, called florets. The flower heads are sessile. The flower heads are cup-shaped, dropping and pendulous, coloured red, 1.5–1.75 inches (3.8–4.4 cm) in length, and 5–8 centimetres (2.0–3.1 in) in diameter. The flower heads are surrounded by a series of seven rows of petal or scale-like 'involucral bracts'. These bracts are all glabrous. The lowest outer bracts grow into long, leafy structures resembling the leaves. The outer bracts are ovate, acuminate, 15 to 20mm long and can end either in a sharp point or with a rounded tip. The inner bracts are longer than the actual florets. They are oblong and slightly concave. It is monoecious, both sexes occur in each flower. The petals and sepals of the florets are fused into a tube-like, dilated, 16.9mm long perianth-sheath. This sheath is scarious (dry, thin, membranous), having three keels and seven veins on the lower part. The lower part is glabrous, but the upper is covered in reddish setulose (bristly) hairs. The sheath has a lip which is 5.6 mm long. This lip has three keels, is setose (densely bristly) on the lower part and ends with three teeth, all three teeth roughly or almost the same length (0.53 mm). All of the stamens are fertile. The filament is 0.53 mm long, dilated and concave. The anthers are oblong-linear and 3.5 mm long. The apical glands are 0.28 mm in length, ovate in shape, with a somewhat sharp tip (subacute), and somewhat swollen on the inner face. The ovary is 2.1 mm long, obovate-oblong in shape, and covered in long, reddish-yellow hairs. It has hypogynous scales which are 1mm in length and oval-oblong in shape. The style is 2.3 centimetres (0.91 in) long, broadened and very much compressed (flat) for about 6.4 mm from the base, and after this portion becoming very constricted, subulate and bending strongly -this slender portion is glabrous and arches inward, but with an oblique angle, thus not towards the centre of the flower head but aiming somewhat behind the centre. The stigma is 3.5 mm long and has an obtuse (blunt) end.

=== Similar species ===
It is quite distinctive in appearance, with long leaves for a needle-leaved Protea. It is closely related to P. witzenbergiana, but this larger species has shorter leaves which are coloured grey as opposed to bright green, and hairy stems which creep along the ground. It is also related to the P. nana, but this species has smaller flower heads. It was initially confused with P. canaliculata, another relative in the section Pinifolia. Phillips, when he originally described it in 1910, compared it with P. rosacea, as P. nana was known at the time, but distinguishes it by having outer bracts that end in a sharp point, and also with P. witzenbergiana, distinguishing it by longer leaves and a larger flower head. In his key to the species of Protea in 1912, Stapf also groups these three species together, finding it most similar to P. witzenbergiana. He distinguishes the two species from each other by the leaf length, but also by P. witzenbergiana having branches clothed in shaggy (villous) hairs as opposed to a glabrous surface. The two are distinguished from P. rosacea (P. nana) by having their lower-most involucral bracts growing into leafy-looking appendages. Staph thus discards the character of a sharp bract apex used Phillips, describing P. pityphylla as having variably a sharp or rounded tip.

== Distribution ==
This species has a very restricted range, occurring in an area of occupancy of only 88 km^{2} (34 sq mi), and it is known from only five localities. It is endemic to the Western Cape province of South Africa. Protea pityphylla is found on the mountains surrounding the Ceres valley: the Skurweberg Mountains, Hex River Mountains, and Olifants River Mountains. In the Hex River Mountains it can be found from Ceres to the Sanddrift Peaks. It occurs on Michell's Pass in the Skurweberge. There is an outlying population on the Dasklip Pass. In the few locations where it does occur, it can grow relatively densely in small isolated stands.

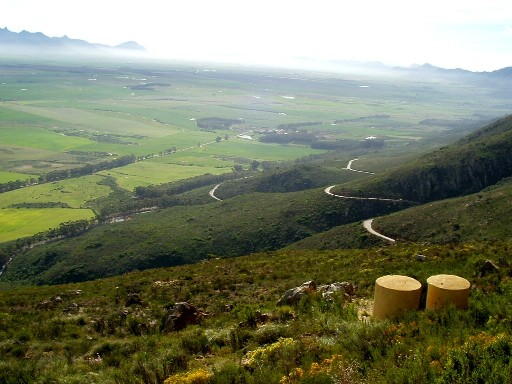
A view from the Dasklip Pass

== Ecology ==
Protea pityphylla grows in mountainous areas in between large rocks and boulders, at altitudes of 500 to 1,500 metres (1,600 to 4,900 ft). The species is restricted to a single habitat which the same source describes as fynbos on sandstone-derived soils and later as high-altitude fynbos on shale-derived soils. The periodic wildfires which burn through this habitat destroy the adult plants, but the seeds can survive such an event. The old, dry, woody, fire-resistant infructescences are persistently retained on the plant for a few years, with the ripe seeds stored inside. When finally released after fires kill the mother plant and open her infructescence, the seeds are dispersed by means of the wind. They germinate during the autumn rains.

In 1998 it was as yet unknown which creature may be responsible for pollination of the flowers, strangely, it produces very little nectar, and yet it has the yeasty scent typical of a protea trying to attract rodents or other small mammals as pollinators. One source states it is probably pollinated by birds. According to SANBI in 2019 birds and insects are thought to provide pollination.

== Conservation ==
Protea pityphylla is a rare plant. Its conservation status was assessed in the 1980 book Threatened plants of southern Africa as 'rare'. In 1996 the South African National Botanical Institute, now the Biodiversity Institute (SANBI), assessed the plant for the Red data list of southern African plants, rating the status of the species as 'not threatened'. In 2009 SANBI re-assessed the status as 'near threatened', but in 2019, in a new assessment, it upgraded the status again to 'vulnerable'. A large amount of plants were eliminated in an area on the mountain above the town of Ceres in the 2010s in order to enlarge the municipal dam. Possible future threats to the species might be the further spread of invasive plants, as well as urban expansion of Ceres. The invasive plants mentioned are specifically Pinus and Acacia, the local Working for Water Project is removing such trees with the stated goal of increasing runoff in the water catchment areas, although this has the added benefit of perhaps helping preserve P. pityphylla. SANBI also lists unspecified natural disasters as a threat. Nonetheless, SANBI reports that it believed that the population numbers had continued to remain unchanged as of 2019.
