= P. nana =

P. nana may refer to:

- Parapsectra nana, a midge species in the genus Parapsectra
- Platanavis nana, a kuzholiid bird species in the genus Platanavis found in the Bissekty Formation in Uzbekistan
- Portea nana, a plant species endemic to Brazil
- Protea nana, a flowering plant species in the genus Protea
- Ptychadena nana, a frog species endemic to Ethiopia
- Puya nana, a plant species endemic to Bolivia

== Synonyms ==
- Phalaena nana, a synonym for Hadena confusa, the marbled coronet, a moth species

== See also ==
- Nana (disambiguation)
