= California State University Northridge Botanic Garden =

Botanic garden in California, US

Coordinates: 34.2389°N 118.5268°W

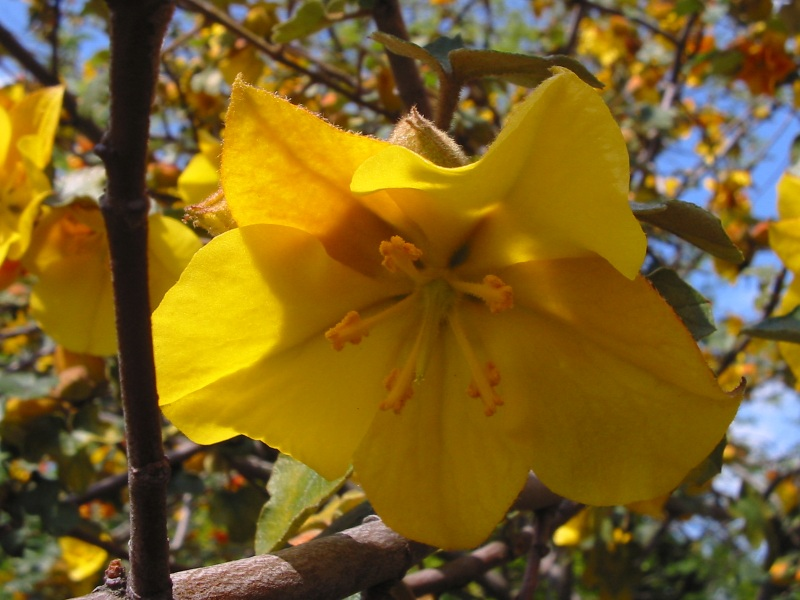
The California Flannelbush in bloom; (Fremontodendron californicum)

The California State University Northridge Botanic Garden or CSUN Botanic Garden is located in the northern San Fernando Valley, in the southeast section ("quadrant") of the California State University, Northridge campus in the community of Northridge in Los Angeles, California.

The 1.5-acre (0.61 ha) site includes a 1-acre (0.40 ha) botanical garden and approximately .5-acre (0.20 ha) of nursery, shadehouse, and greenhouse zones. The botanic gardens were established shortly after the campus was established in 1959, as a Valley branch of California State University, Los Angeles (CSULA). It has grown through the administrations of succeeding San Fernando Valley State College and the present day CSUN Biology Department.

== History ==
The botanical garden was first created in 1959, over 60 years old and originally planted with only California native plants but has since expanded to a collection of over 1,200 plant species. The garden also offers a native food garden over an acre of land. There are four greenhouses in the garden: “a living library of diverse plant specimens, an outdoor classroom for students of all ages and interests, a beautiful refuge for quiet study or strolling, an ever-changing setting to paint or sketch, and a valued community asset”.

The garden is community run and funded through fundraising events. Students of California State University tend to the garden through course focused botany courses. The public also has access to these courses from horticultural experts. The garden itself operates on a water-conserving landscape. California State University Northridge students use these plant species for research projects that include “biological principles, plant biology, plant ecology, plant morphology, plant physiology, and entomology”.

The overall goals for the garden are:

1. Plants that are attainable and usable for local sustainability landscapes that feature sustainable gardening techniques, water conservation, and saving endangered plants and species, including the bees.
2. Student accessibility for education and on hands practice for ‘planting ethnobotany insights’.

One of the few remaining historic (circa the 1920s) orange groves is thriving on the southeastern campus quad. The citrus industry was formerly had groves covering much of the San Fernando Valley. The rows of large eucalyptus trees, historic windbreaks for agricultural fields from the late 19th century, are found towering over the perimeters of the campus, surviving planners developing campus expansions with valor.

California State University has the recognition of the Bee Campus USA certification. This fostered a great opportunity for pollinator-focused efforts throughout the gardens that allows students, volunteers and facility to improve the health of the vital pollinator populations. In November 2018, California State University Northridge was certified as a Bee Campus USA affiliate.

California State University Northridge has an official Sustainability Day every year on October 24, which is recognized throughout the campus, school and faculty. In 2019 the university focused on the topic of biodiversity loss. They highlighted prime examples of the different impacts and losses on ecosystems, populations and cultures. California State University Northridge's Dr. Rachel Mackelprang, biology professor, discussed the possible threats of the honey bee populations that are a worldwide threat. She highlighted the importance of these pollinators and discusses their vital role in pollinating a myriad of food products.

Dr. Mackelpang also discussed the research and work done on the honey bees in California State University Northridge's own orange grove and the impacts and role that the university plays in creating an improvement for the community and world.

In 2020 California State University Northridge and community partners turned the unused corners of CSUN's garden into a safe haven for pollinators, such as the hummingbirds and bees. These species are critical to growing the planet's food supply.

These areas created learning opportunities for students from numerous colleges, not just the California State University of Northridge. They provided learning outcomes from majors of science, social services, humanities, history, and urban studies. These areas gave the community room to explore, grow and learn about the city's history. Organizers included local children in the building expansion, which fostered learning for these endangered pollinators.

CSUN and a team of community partners are turning unused corners of the city into safe havens for bees, hummingbirds, and other pollinators that are critical to growing the planet's food supply.

Once the pockets are planted and built, Zappia said, he hopes they will provide extra learning opportunities for CSUN students from several different colleges — including science, social services, humanities, urban studies, and history majors — giving them a chance to explore the community and learn more about the city's rich history in a hands-on way. The organizers also hope to involve local school children in the project, to teach them the importance of pollinators and about the dwindling bee population.

California State University has minimized the use of pesticides that could be or are potential harmful for the bee populations and other at risk pollinators.

== Overview ==
The CSUN Botanical Garden is open for everyone without charge from Monday through Friday from 8:00 am to 4:45 pm on CSUN's campus. The garden is closed on weekends and university holidays. In specific cases, management may also close the Botanical Garden on unexpected days or hours during cases of severe weather.

The CSUN Botanical Garden is located in the southeast quadrant of California State University, Northridge. The location includes a botanical garden with a variety of unique plants, a nursery, a shade house, and greenhouse areas.

The CSUN Botanical Garden department staff can be contacted by either Email or telephone. Individuals interested in finding more information about the CSUN Botanical Garden can contact the staff via email. Their telephone may be reached at (818)-677-3496. The department staff may also be faxed at (818)-677-2034.

== Collections ==
The Botanic Garden was originally planted exclusively with Californian native plants in 1959. Since then the garden has evolved and expanded into a diverse collection representing diverse different geographic regions and themes, with over 1,200 species and cultivars present.

The different sections of the garden contain trees, palms, shrubs, 'subshrubs,' perennials, bulbs, cacti, succulents, herbs, annual plants and wildflowers, ground covers, butterfly and beneficial insect sustainers, edibles, and other plant types from; California and the other four Mediterranean climate plant regions of the world, Asia, Australia, and New Zealand, Europe, the Americas, and other continents and regions. An ethnobotanical and a contemporary water-conserving landscape are being developed.

More specific plant species than can be found in the garden are:

Portea petropolitana, Giant White Squill/Sea Squill (Drimia Urginea maritima), Sundew (Drosera spp.), Parry's Agave/Mescal Agave (Agave Parryi), White Spider Lily (Hymenocallis), Sensitive Plant/Sleeping Beauty (Mimosa pudica), and the Coast Redwood Tree.

The native food garden is an entire arce long with fruit orchids, a pollinator space and pine garden. Collections in the native food garden include: California poppies, Native Bunch Gras s (Wild Dry), Purple Needle Grass, Mugwort, sub shrubs, coast morning glory (Ipomoea cairica), tomato plant, coyote gourd (Cucurbita palmata), golden currant (Ribes aureum), gooseberries, California buckwheat (Eriogonum fasciculatum), Cleveland sage (Salvia clevelandii), black elderberry (Sambucus cerulea), torrey pine, chaparral sage (Salvia clevelandii), California bristle bush (Encelia californica), coastal golden bush (Isocoma menziesii), islands mallow (Malva assurgentiflora), cheese weed (Malva parviflora), pomegranate tree (Punica protopunica), and native cover crop.

== Public activities ==
1. The Botanic Garden is open to the public Monday to Friday, 8:00 a.m. to 4:45 p.m. It is closed on weekends and university holidays, and occasionally during extreme weather. The entrance is reached via parking structures off Nordhoff or Zelzah (depending on campus construction).
2. The CSUN Botanic Garden has short courses on a wide variety of garden topics by horticultural experts for the public. It also sponsors 'CSUN-al Gardening', a series of four free gardening-themed classes a year. The gardens also gives K-12 school tours.
3. Some fun public activities include the CSUN-al Gardening. A free gardening class that is offered four times a year: Spring, Summer, Fall, and Winter. Each class is themed for that season, an example is in Summer 2019 with a class called Orchid Mania. Arthur Pinkers taught the class various ways of how different orchid species could be taken care of and raised. To join the class early registration is required and must be emailed to the Botanic Garden. As of right now, there are no classes available to register for in the upcoming year 2022.
4. Another activity available at the Botanic Gardens is tours that are offered to local schools from Kindergarten to College level at no charge. The tours can vary between 20 and 40 minutes and can be increased to be more in-depth. Group sizes are best limited to 20 or fewer attendees per tour guide. To be able to schedule a tour for the garden, you can reach a host by calling (818) 677–3496. The tour needs to be planned far in advance because a minimum of 4 weeks is needed for the best tour date. Directions and parking can be found on the csun.edu website. Special arrangements will need to be made for buses. Groups arriving by car are encouraged to carpool as space is limited in campus parking lots. Parking fees are $6 (up to 4 hours) or $8 (over 4 hours) per car. As of right now in 2022 the garden is off-limits to the public due to health concerns and tours are paused until further notice.

== Volunteer work ==
The Northridge Botanical Garden is maintained by facility staff and volunteers. Volunteers are an essential part to the garden in making sure the plants are taken care of and that bigger projects on site are completed in record time. Meetings are held on Thursday morning from 8:30 to 11:30 at the Greenhouse Complex. Registering to become a volunteer isn't required, but Volunteer Release forms need to be completed the first time a person joins the group. The rules are lax but for safety reasons, a volunteer needs to wear appropriate attire such as closed shoes and gardening clothes.

Most of the tasks completed by volunteers are simple and light. Activities such as weeding, starting seeds, transplanting, soil mixing, propagation, minor pruning, composting, grooming of plant material, and repotting are often done. These tasks can be completed singularly or in groups.

The benefits of being a volunteer result in long lasting abilities in gardening. Some aspects learned during the work sessions include taking inventory, labeling, record entry, seed collection, etc. Most use the volunteer work at the Botanical Gardens to learn how to care for plants before applying it on their own at home.

It's encouraged to partake in plant trades between volunteers at the Botanical Garden. The main goal of the garden is to have a large diversity in the collection and it's in the best interest of the garden to have duplicates. If there was ever a chance that a plant was to be lost in the garden, another one can be located in the volunteer's garden. It's preferred to have named specimens that enhance the collection for class use. Surplus plant material generated by volunteer work projects is available for adoption by Garden Volunteers.

== Photographs ==
- CSUN Today
- BeeCityUSA
- Daily Sundial

== In popular culture ==
CSUN's botany garden has been featured in many articles, websites and media over the years. One of the most notable is the garden's feature as one of the 50 “most amazing” university gardens by Best Colleges Online. The garden has also been featured on the university own CSUN Today, highlighting the gardens history and commentary from the garden's manager Brena Kanno. The garden was featured in the Daily Sundial in 2022, as well as a hit feature in the LA Times in 2000.

California State University Northridge offers a wide variety of courses surrounding the use of the gardens. These courses are available to students and facility. The garden itself is available for free access to all but the course allows students to generate research projects in biology, plant biology, plant morphology, plant physiology and entomology.

CSUN Today has written the following about the Botanic Garden: "CSUN’s Botanic Garden is operated by the university’s Department of Biology and serves as a field site for botany, entomology, photography, painting and other classes. In addition to geographically themed plantings and a butterfly garden, the garden also features greenhouses where noteworthy botanical specimens are grown."

The garden also offer free academic tours for K-12 and college students. Tours are typically 20–40 minutes, but can be arranged for a longer tour time. Group sizes are recommended to fewer than 20 peoples.

The garden also is usable as an event site for weddings, private parties, filming for TV, commercial use, and music videos. Pricing is unknown, as well as features in any of these event areas.

== See also ==
- California Native Plant Society
- List of botanical gardens in the United States
- Mediterranean forests, woodlands, and scrub
- Natural landscaping
- Sustainable landscaping
- Wildlife garden
- Xeriscaping
