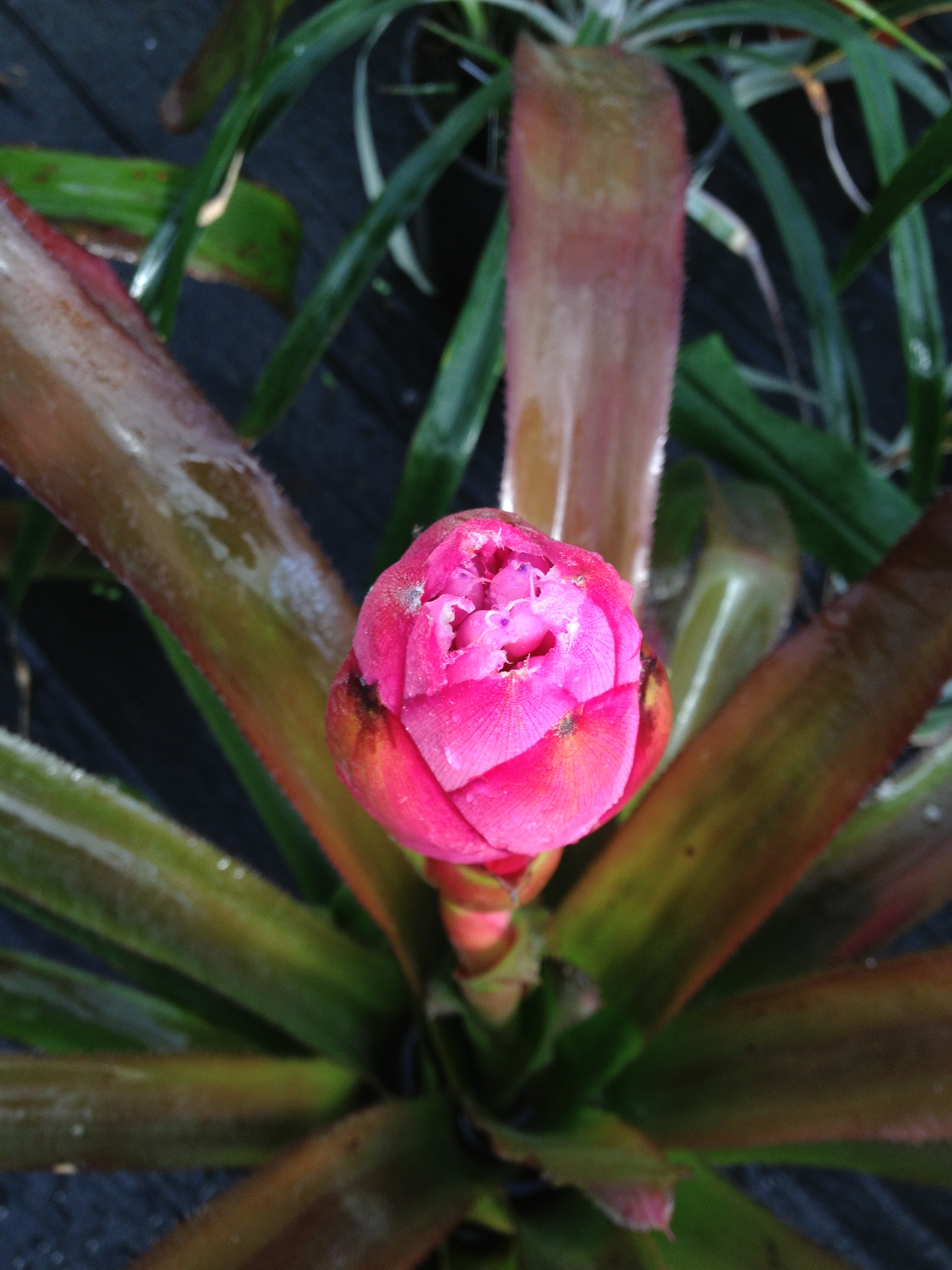

Scientific classification
- Kingdom: Plantae
- Clade: Tracheophytes
- Clade: Angiosperms
- Clade: Monocots
- Clade: Commelinids
- Order: Poales
- Family: Bromeliaceae
- Genus: Portea
- Species: P. grandiflora

Binomial name
- Portea grandiflora Philcox

= Portea grandiflora =

Species of flowering plant

Portea grandiflora is a plant species in the genus Portea endemic to northeastern Brazil.

The bromeliad is endemic to the Atlantic Forest biome (Mata Atlantica Brasileira) and to Bahia state, located in southeastern Brazil.

== Etymology ==
Grandiflora means 'having large flowers'.

== Gallery ==
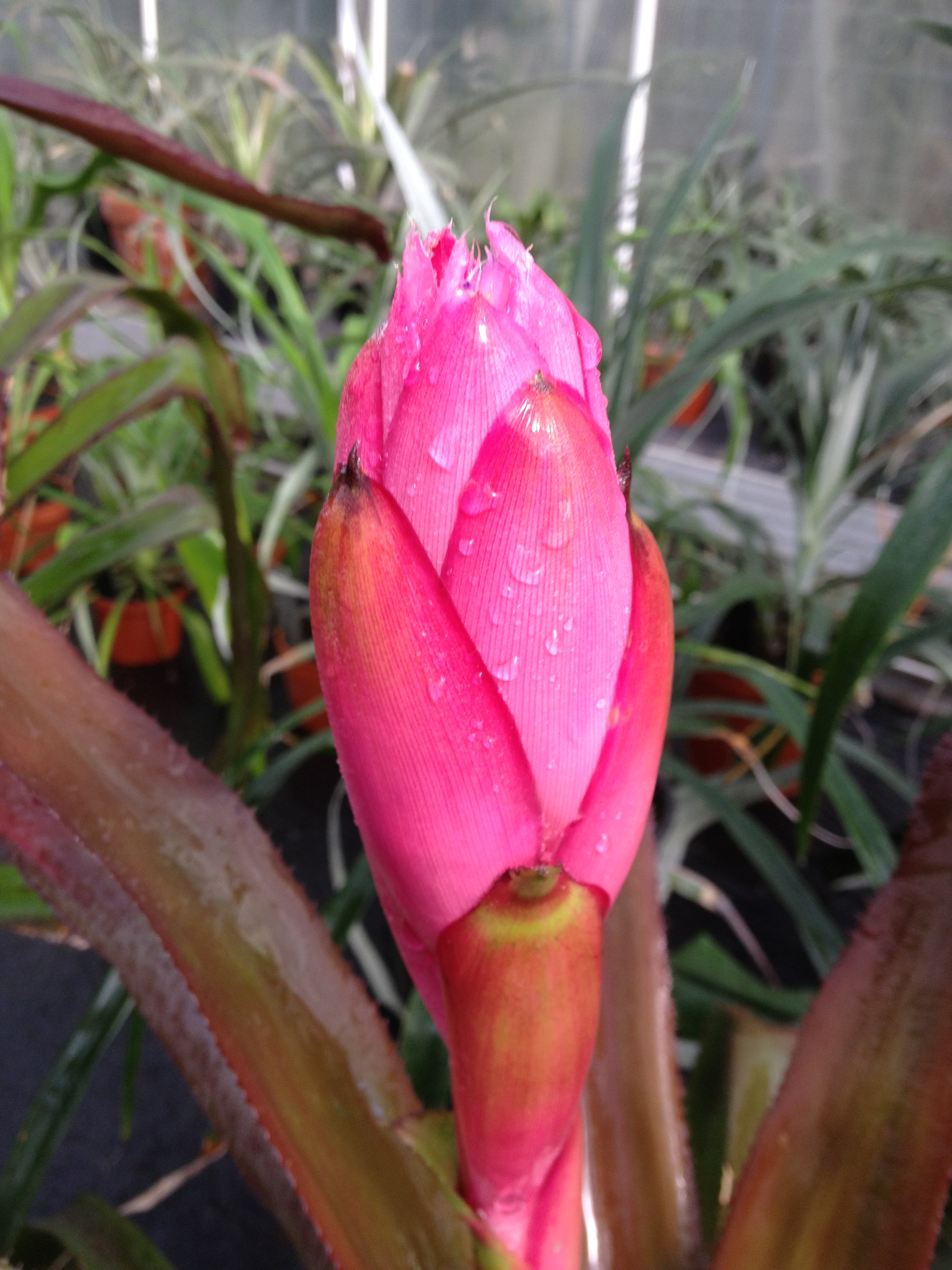
P. grandiflora flower

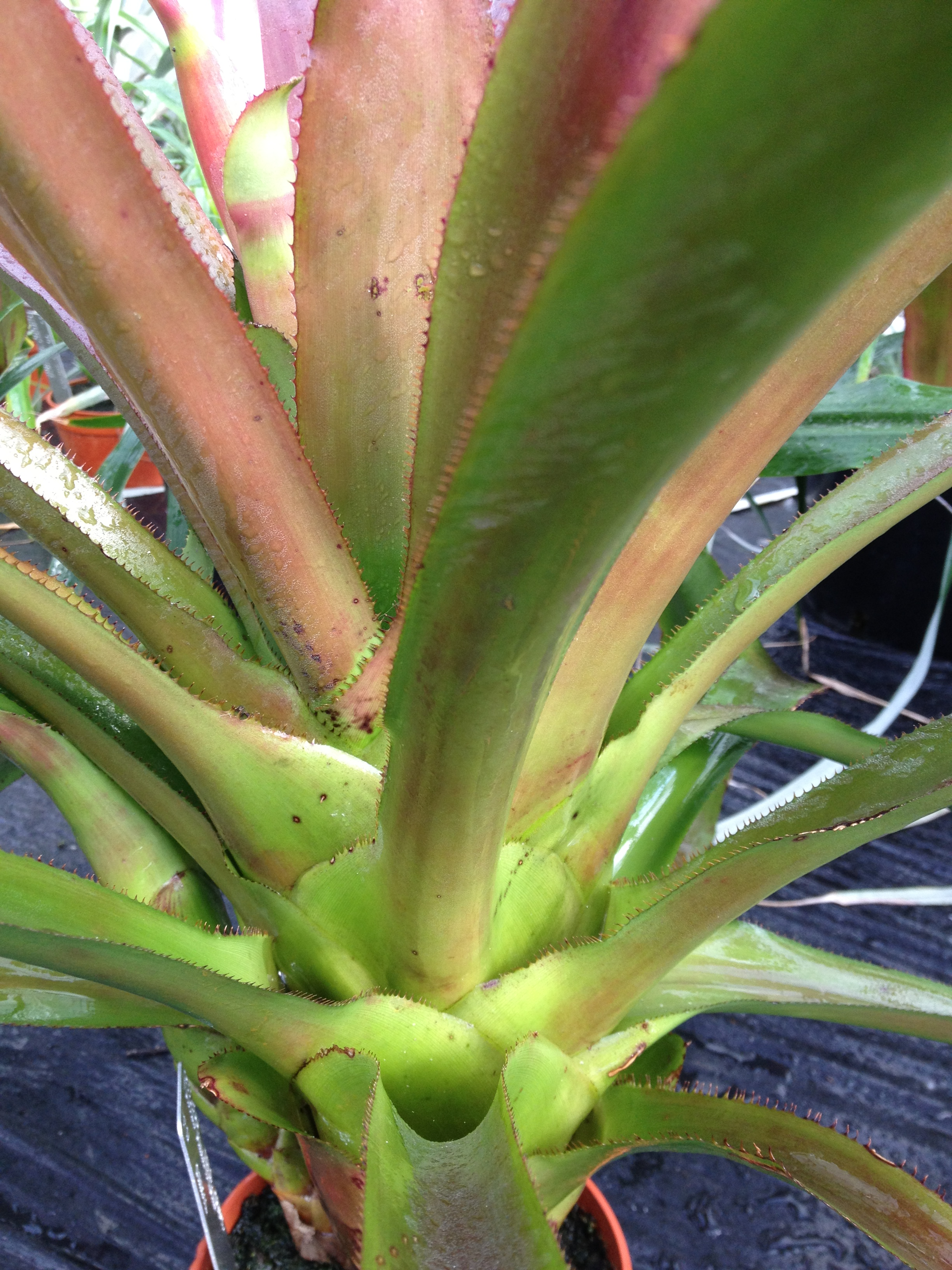
P. grandiflora foliage
