= Portea silveirae =

Scientific classification
- Kingdom: Plantae
- Clade: Embryophytes
- Clade: Tracheophytes
- Clade: Spermatophytes
- Clade: Angiosperms
- Clade: Monocots
- Clade: Commelinids
- Order: Poales
- Family: Bromeliaceae
- Genus: Portea
- Species: P. silveirae

Binomial name
- Portea silveirae Mez

Species of flowering plant

Portea silveirae is a species of flowering plant in the family Bromeliaceae. This bromeliad is endemic to the Atlantic Forest biome (Mata Atlantica Brasileira), located in southeastern Brazil. It is found within Bahia, Espírito Santo, and Minas Gerais states.
