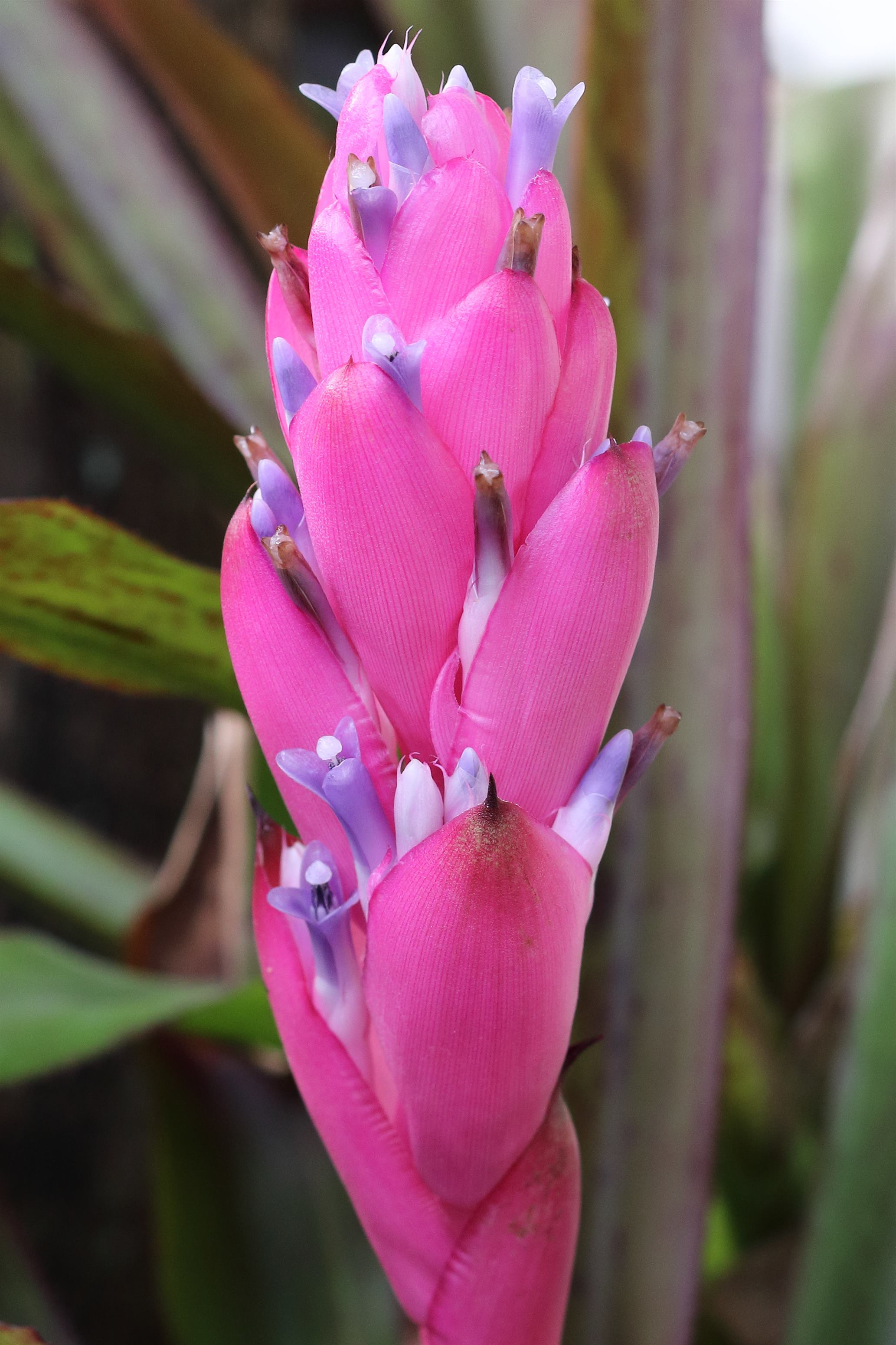

Scientific classification
- Kingdom: Plantae
- Clade: Tracheophytes
- Clade: Angiosperms
- Clade: Monocots
- Clade: Commelinids
- Order: Poales
- Family: Bromeliaceae
- Genus: Portea
- Species: P. kermesina

Binomial name
- Portea kermesina K.Koch

Synonyms
- Billbergia brongniartii Regel

= Portea kermesina =

Species of flowering plant

Portea kermesina ('kermesina'=crimson) is a species of flowering plant in the family Bromeliaceae . The bromeliad is endemic to the Atlantic Forest biome (Mata Atlantica Brasileira) and to Bahia state, located in southeastern Brazil.

It grows near rivers at sea level. It is a critically endangered species.

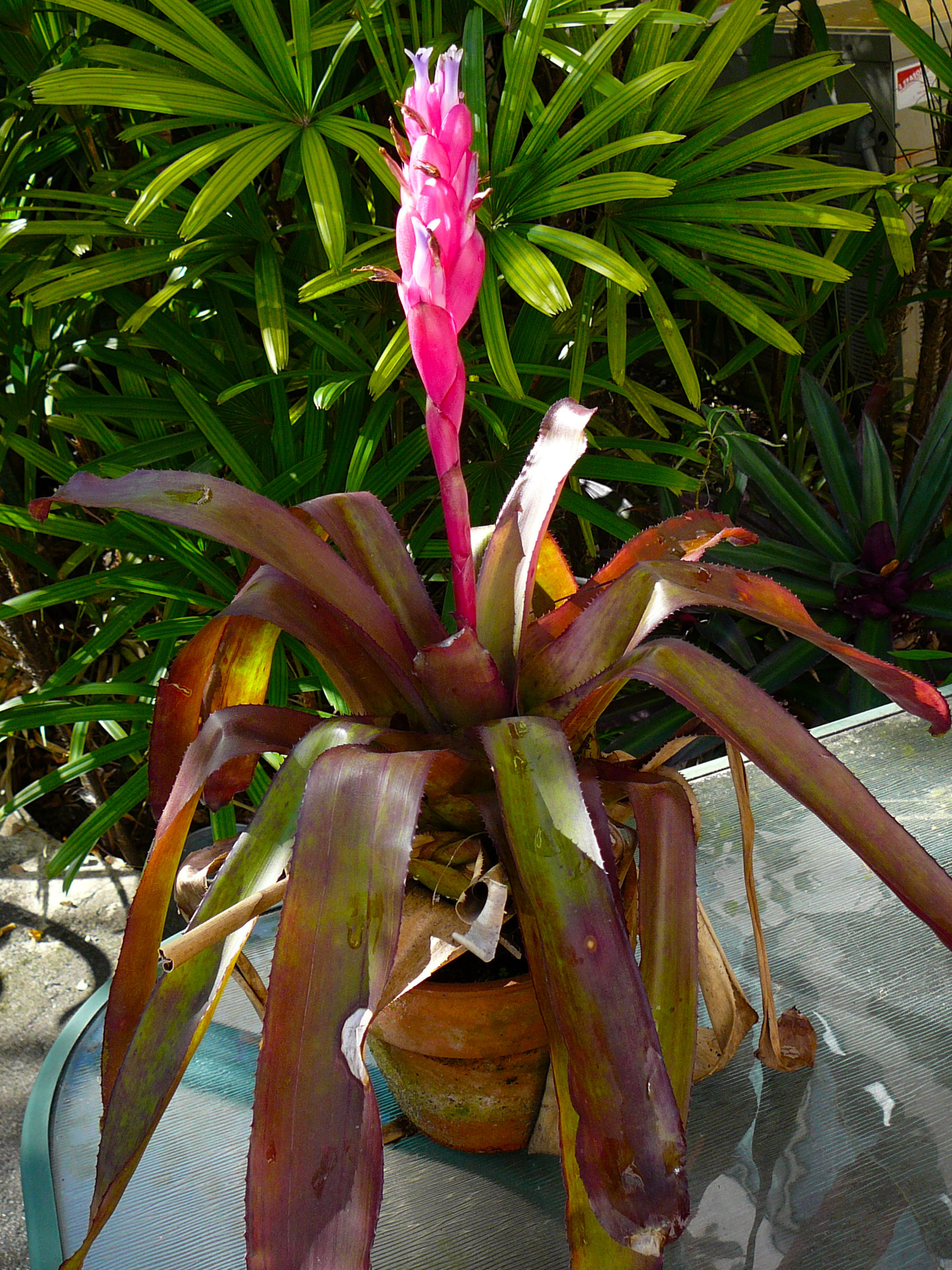
Portea kermesiana leaves and bloom spike.

== Description ==
Portea kermesina contains a dozen or so broad green and red leaves, that reach 750 mm (30 in) long and 50 mm (2 in) wide.

The plant produces a flower spike with "large, rose bracts and blue-petaled flowers." The inflorescence flowers at a height of 150–200 mm (6–8 in) and is characterized by a purplish red color.

Porteas from Brazil are some of the most decorative. Portea kermesina has apple green leaves and thrives in diffused light.
