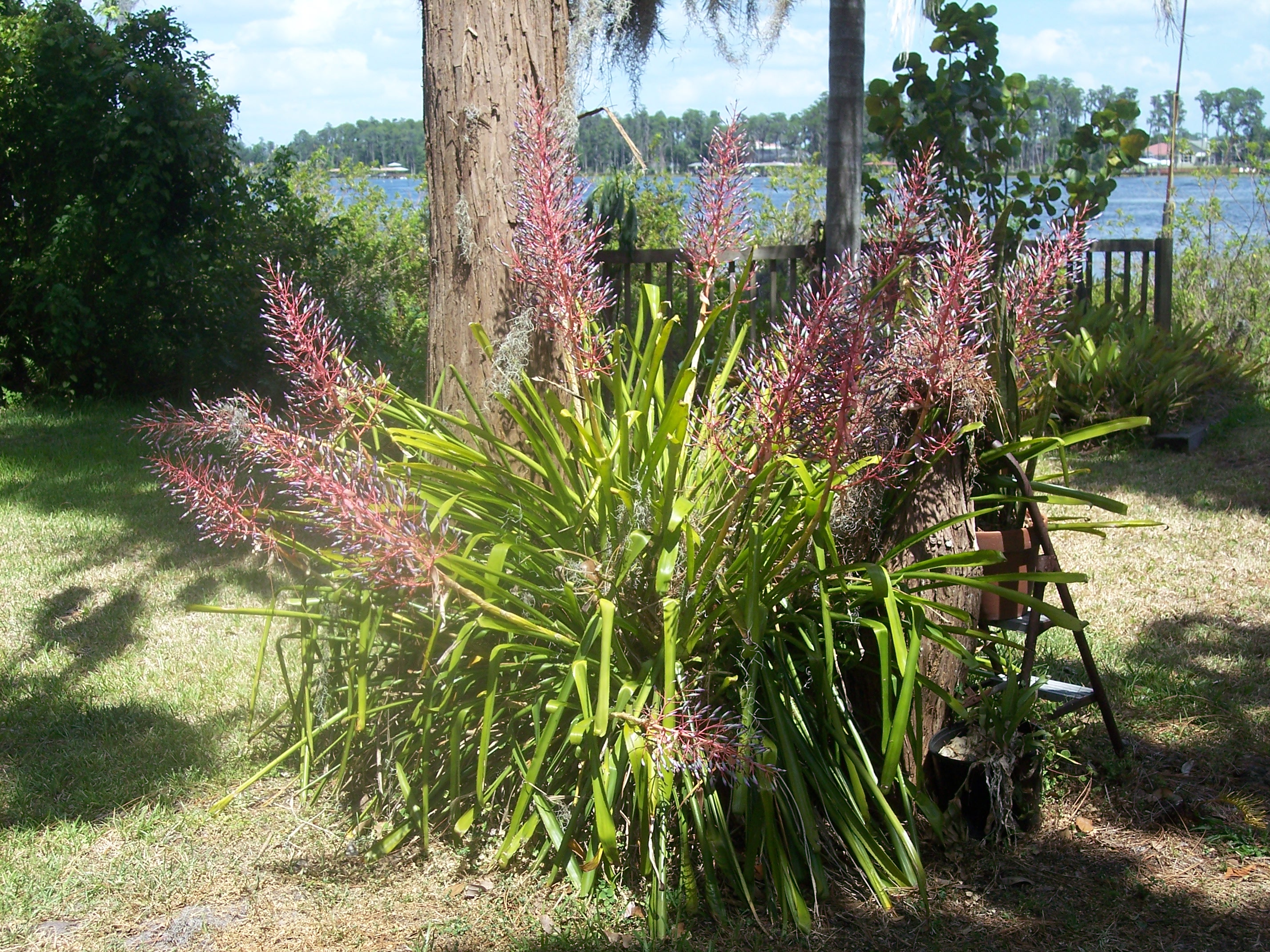
- Flowering Portea

Scientific classification
- Kingdom: Plantae
- Clade: Tracheophytes
- Clade: Angiosperms
- Clade: Monocots
- Clade: Commelinids
- Order: Poales
- Family: Bromeliaceae
- Subfamily: Bromelioideae
- Genus: Portea; Brongn. ex K.Koch

Type species
- Portea kermesina

= Portea =

Genus of flowering plants

Portea is a genus in the plant family Bromeliaceae, subfamily Bromelioideae. It is native to the Atlantic coast of Brazil.

The genus is named for Dr. Marius Porte, a nineteenth-century French naturalist who died in 1866, in Manila, while on a specimen-collecting expedition for the French National Museum of Natural History.

== Characteristics ==
Portea is a small genus of New World plants, and according to the Bromeliad Binomial, currently includes nine species. The bromeliads are endemic to the eastern Atlantic coast of Brazil, where the sea breezes, marine layer, adequate precipitation and year-round favorable temperatures can see these plants grow upwards of 5 feet (1.52 m) or taller, especially when blooms are accounted for.

They thrive in most lighting conditions, from bright shade to strong, indirect light as well as all-day sun or partial sun, being one of the bromeliad genera that does best in full sun. More light results in better leaf form, color; additionally, adequate lighting triggers repeat, annual flowering cycles, sometimes blooming twice in a year. The tall, profuse inflorescences are often dripping with nectar, and are frequented by many hummingbirds, sunbirds and other pollinators.

The foliage of this genus often is quite attractive, if not simple in its lime-chartreuse green hue. Increased sunlight and slightly decreased moisture can give an appealing, “sun-stressed” reddish-bronze shade to the leaves, as can cooler autumn and winter temperatures. The length of the inflorescence is rather impressive, measuring nearly 3 feet (1 meter) long, eventually “drooping” slightly, from the weight of the flowers and berries (once pollinated), adding to the plant’s impressive stature as a whole.

As with many bromeliads, the leaves’ perimeters are lined with tiny, saw-like “teeth”, which, while not dangerously sharp—such as the spines of a Dyckia or Hechtia—, may cause an itchy reaction in the skin if contact is made. This is due to the natural presence of bromelain, an enzyme found among the Bromeliaceae and commonly used in digestive supplements. This enzyme is most prevalent, however, in pineapples (genus Ananas), another type of bromeliad.

== Species ==
Image	Scientific name	Distribution
	Portea alatisepala Philcox	southeastern Brazil.
	Portea filifera L.B. Smith	Bahia state, southeastern Brazil.
	Portea fosteriana L.B. Smith	Espírito Santo, southeastern Brazil.
	Portea grandiflora Philcox	Bahia state, southeastern Brazil.
	Portea kermesina K. Koch	Bahia state, southeastern Brazil.
	Portea nana Leme & H. Luther	Bahia state, southeastern Brazil.
	Portea orthopoda (Baker) Coffani-Nunes & Wanderley	Brazil
	Portea petropolitana (Wawra) Mez	Bahia, Espírito Santo, Minas Gerais, and Rio de Janeiro, Brazil
	Portea silveirae Mez	Bahia, Espírito Santo, and Minas Gerais

== Cultivars ==
- Portea 'Helga Tarver'
- Portea 'June'
