= Portea fosteriana =

Scientific classification
- Kingdom: Plantae
- Clade: Tracheophytes
- Clade: Angiosperms
- Clade: Monocots
- Clade: Commelinids
- Order: Poales
- Family: Bromeliaceae
- Genus: Portea
- Species: P. fosteriana

Binomial name
- Portea fosteriana L.B.Sm.

Species of flowering plant

Portea fosteriana is a plant species in the genus Portea.

The bromeliad is endemic to the Atlantic Forest biome (Mata Atlantica Brasileira) and to Espírito Santo, located in southeastern Brazil.
