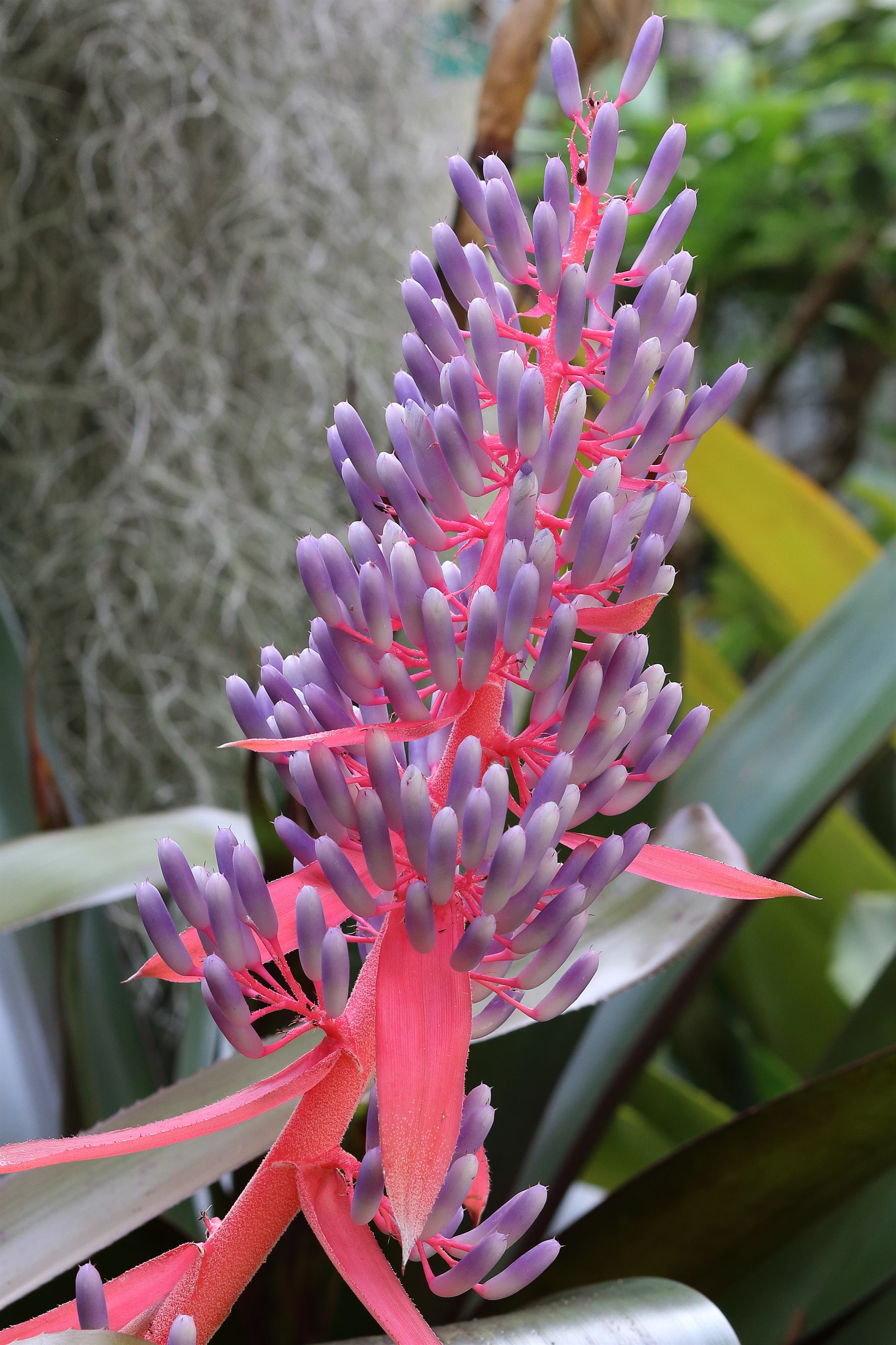

Scientific classification
- Kingdom: Plantae
- Clade: Tracheophytes
- Clade: Angiosperms
- Clade: Monocots
- Clade: Commelinids
- Order: Poales
- Family: Bromeliaceae
- Genus: Portea
- Species: P. alatisepala

Binomial name
- Portea alatisepala Philcox

= Portea alatisepala =

Species of flowering plant

Portea alatisepala is a plant species in the genus Portea.

The bromeliad is endemic to Bahia state and to the Atlantic Forest biome (Mata Atlantica Brasileira), located in southeastern Brazil.
