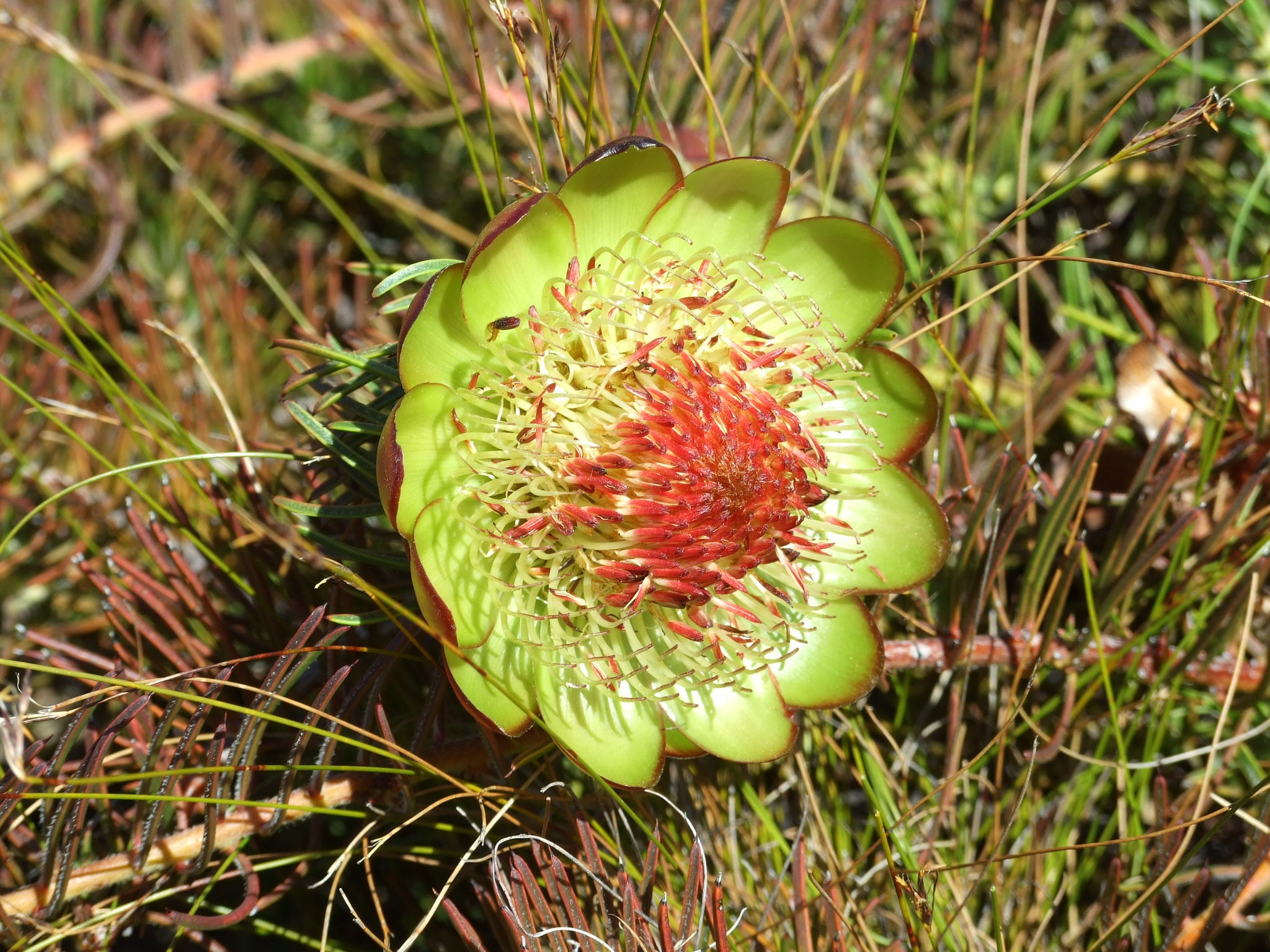

Conservation status
- Least Concern (IUCN 3.1)

Scientific classification
- Kingdom: Plantae
- Clade: Embryophytes
- Clade: Tracheophytes
- Clade: Angiosperms
- Clade: Eudicots
- Order: Proteales
- Family: Proteaceae
- Genus: Protea
- Species: P. witzenbergiana

Binomial name
- Protea witzenbergiana E.Phillips

= Protea witzenbergiana =

Species of flowering plant

Protea witzenbergiana, or Swan sugarbush, is a flowering shrub of the genus Protea.

== Taxonomy ==
Protea witzenbergiana was first described by Edwin Percy Phillips in 1910, from specimens found growing in the Witzenberg range by Karl Ludwig Philipp Zeyher and William John Burchell.

== Description ==
The shrub spreads out and can become 3 metres (9.8 ft) in diameter and 0.5 metres (1 ft 8 in) high. It blooms in Autumn to early Winter, from March to June with the peak in April to May.

== Distribution ==
The plant is endemic to the Western Cape, South Africa, and occurs from the Cederberg, through the Koue Bokkeveld Mountains and the Witzenberg, to Hex River Mountains and the Bokkerivier Mountains. It is found near the towns of Tulbagh and Ceres.

It is somewhat similar to Protea pityphylla and P. pendula.

== Ecology ==
Potential wildfires destroy the shrub, but the seeds can survive such an event. The plant is monoecious with both sexes in each flower. It is thought that rodents are probably responsible for pollination. The seeds are spread by the wind. The plant grows on mountainous slopes at altitudes of 750 to 1,800 metres (2,460 to 5,910 ft).

== Conservation ==
The population is considered stable.
