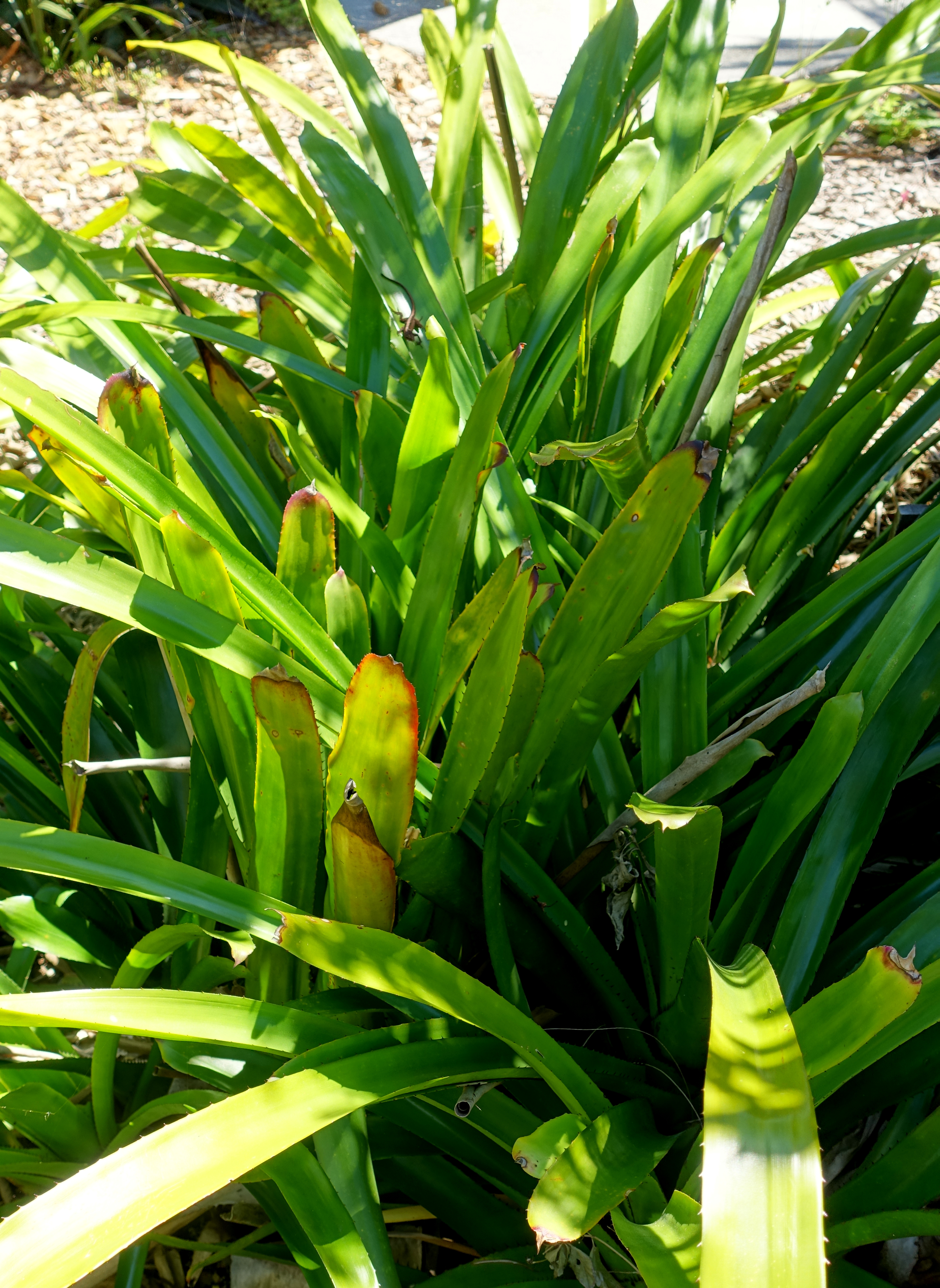

Scientific classification
- Kingdom: Plantae
- Clade: Tracheophytes
- Clade: Angiosperms
- Clade: Monocots
- Clade: Commelinids
- Order: Poales
- Family: Bromeliaceae
- Genus: Portea
- Species: P. orthopoda

Binomial name
- Portea orthopoda (Baker) Coffani-Nunes & Wanderley

= Portea orthopoda =

Species of flowering plant

Portea orthopoda is a plant species in the genus Portea.

== Cultivars ==
- × Portemea 'Puna'
