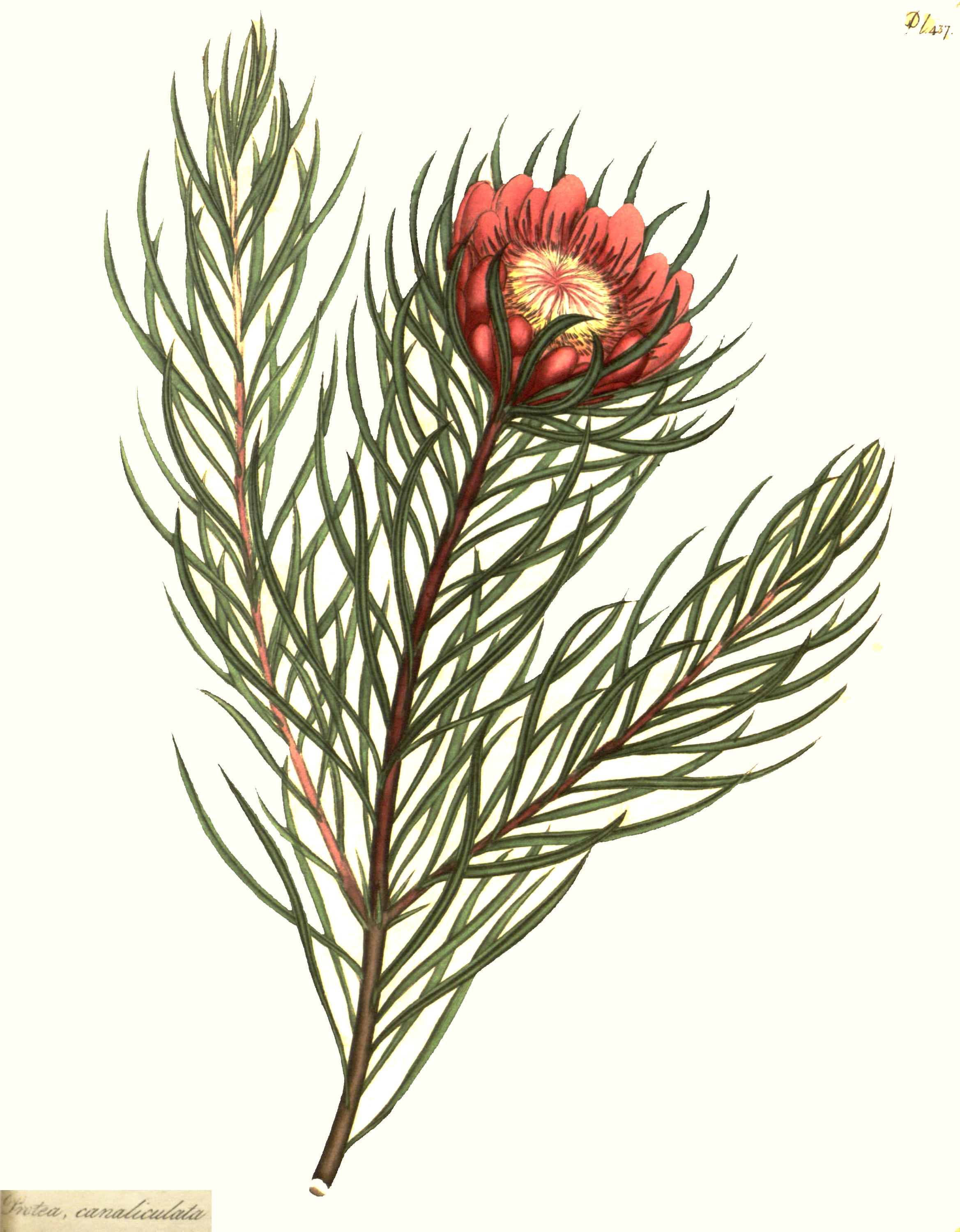
- Original botanical illustration

Conservation status
- Least Concern (IUCN 3.1)

Scientific classification
- Kingdom: Plantae
- Clade: Tracheophytes
- Clade: Angiosperms
- Clade: Eudicots
- Order: Proteales
- Family: Proteaceae
- Genus: Protea
- Species: P. canaliculata

Binomial name
- Protea canaliculata Andrews

Synonyms
- Erodendrum paeoniiflorum Knight; Protea harmeri E.Phillips; Protea polygaloides Willd.; Scolymocephalus canaliculatus (Andrews) Kuntze

= Protea canaliculata =

Species of shrub

Protea canaliculata, also known as the groove-leaf sugarbush, is a species of flowering shrub of the genus Protea, which is endemic to the Cape Provinces of South Africa.

In Afrikaans, this species is known by the vernacular name of bergroossuikerbos.

== Taxonomy ==
The plant was first described as a new species in the botanical magazine The botanist's repository, for new and rare plants started by Henry Cranke Andrews. Since the magazine was undated, and the authorship of the species descriptions was never made clear, it is difficult to determine when and by whom the species descriptions were written. Sources differ on who wrote the text on this species, and when. A contemporary of the time, Richard Anthony Salisbury, enumerating Proteaceae species in the 1809 On the cultivation of the plants belonging to the natural order of Proteeae by Joseph Knight, attributed the authorship of Protea canaliculata to Adrian Hardy Haworth. Salisbury, himself uncredited in the work, moved the species to his new genus Erodendrum, renaming it E. pæoniflorum, and coining the vernacular name 'peony-flowered erodendrum' for it. In the 1810 On the Proteaceae of Jussieu, Robert Brown represents the species as P. canaliculata, and simply attributes the name to "And. Repos.", whilst completely ignoring Salisbury's 1809 work.

In later 19th century publications, such as the supplement to Genera plantarum, the authorship of the name is attributed to Andrews' Botanical Repository, citing the work of Robert Brown. In other works, such as Prodromus Systematis Naturalis Regni Vegetabilis, the authorship is attributed to "Andr. Bot. repos.", an abbreviation of Andrews' Botanical Repository.

In 1916, James Britten opined that it was Haworth who had written the text, and he ascribes the publication of the issue to no earlier than December 1806. In the 1912 Flora Capensis, Haworth is also attributed as the authority for the name.

In 1941, Takenoshin Nakai gave the publication date as 1806. Although he doesn't specify the day, a species published just before it in the same magazine is dated to 1 December 1806. Also, only five species plates were published that year, suggesting that the publication date was probably in December 1806.

In 1988, Taxonomic Literature ascribes the name to George Jackson, dating the publication to December 1806, along with eight other plates.

== Description ==
Protea canaliculata is a shrub which can reach up to 1.2 metres in height. The branches are glabrous, red, and are decumbent, somewhat decumbent, or grow upright.

The linear, glabrous leaves are 5–7 inches (13–18 cm) long, but only 1.6 to 3.2mm wide, and end in a sharp-to- somewhat-sharp pointed tip. The leaves are narrowed at their bases and are indistinctly veined. The upper surface is concave, and this forms a "particular strong channel on the back of its leaves" from which the specific epithet was adopted.

It blooms in autumn and winter, from March to June, with the peak in May. The inflorescence is sessile, lacking a stalk. It is 1.75 inches (4.4 cm) tall, and 1.5 inches (3.8 cm) in diameter. There are nine series of bracts surrounding the flower head, the outer ones being ovate in shape, with a rounded apex, and are covered in silky hairs and have a fringe of hairs along their margins (ciliate). The inner bracts are more oblong and concave in shape, also ciliate, but with less silky hairs, with the innermost bracts glabrous and the length of the flowers. The plant is monoecious with both sexes in each flower.

The fruits are woody and persistent, which means they are retained on the plant after senescence. Possible wildfires will destroy the mature plants, but the seeds will survive such an event, retained in caps in the dried inflorescence. When released after such fires, the seeds are dispersed by means of the wind.

== Distribution ==
The plant is endemic to the central region of the Western Cape province of South Africa. It is found in the mountain ranges of the Little Karoo, where it occurs from the Hex River Mountains to the Waboomsberg and Groot Swartberge. It grows in the Ouberg Pass, Western Cape. The species usually occurs in low densities as scattered plants over a wide area, but occasionally it may be found growing clustered together in dense stands.

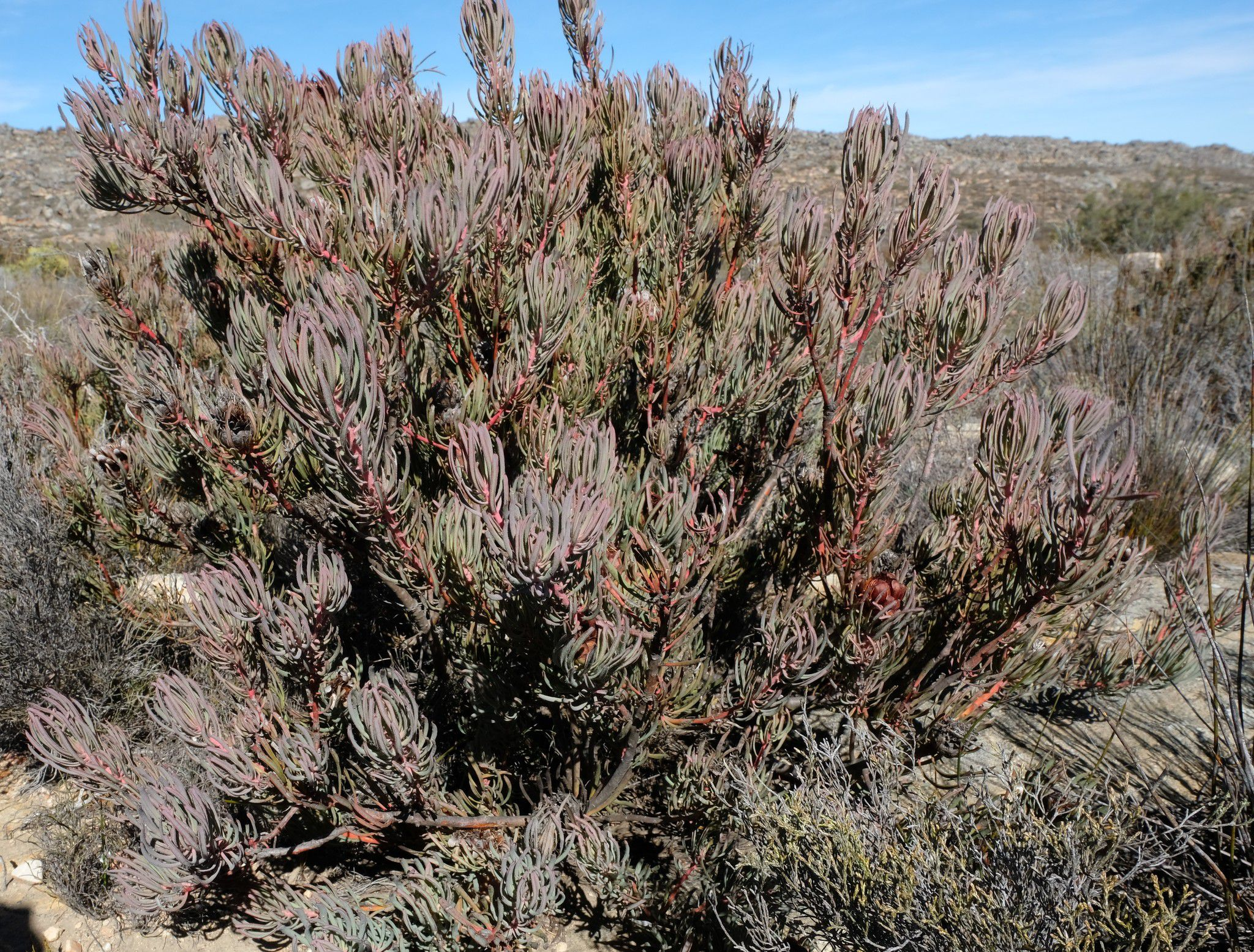
Habitus during a winter drought at Drie Kuilen, Western Cape, South Africa.

== Ecology ==
Protea canaliculata grows in rocky, open, quartzite- or sandstone-derived soils at altitudes of 800 to 1,500 metres, or 700 to 1,700 metres. It is found growing in a montane fynbos habitat.

Pollination was thought to probably occur by mediation of birds, but rodents and birds are both now considered to be implicated.

== Horticulture ==
It was first grown in Europe in the first few years of the 19th century in the collection of the wealthy merchant George Hibbert, from seeds collected by James Niven at a valley called Lange Kloof in the Cape region.

== Conservation ==
The world population of the species was considered not threatened in 1998. It was first assessed as 'least concern' by the South African National Biodiversity Institute (SANBI) in 2009. According to the 2019 SANBI assessment it is widespread and not in danger of extinction, with the total population assumed to be stable. There are no present threats to the population, but potential threats identified for local stands are competition from invasive plants and too frequent fires. Because this species needs time to mature before producing a seed set, fires occurring too soon after each other may kill the plants before being able to reproduce.
