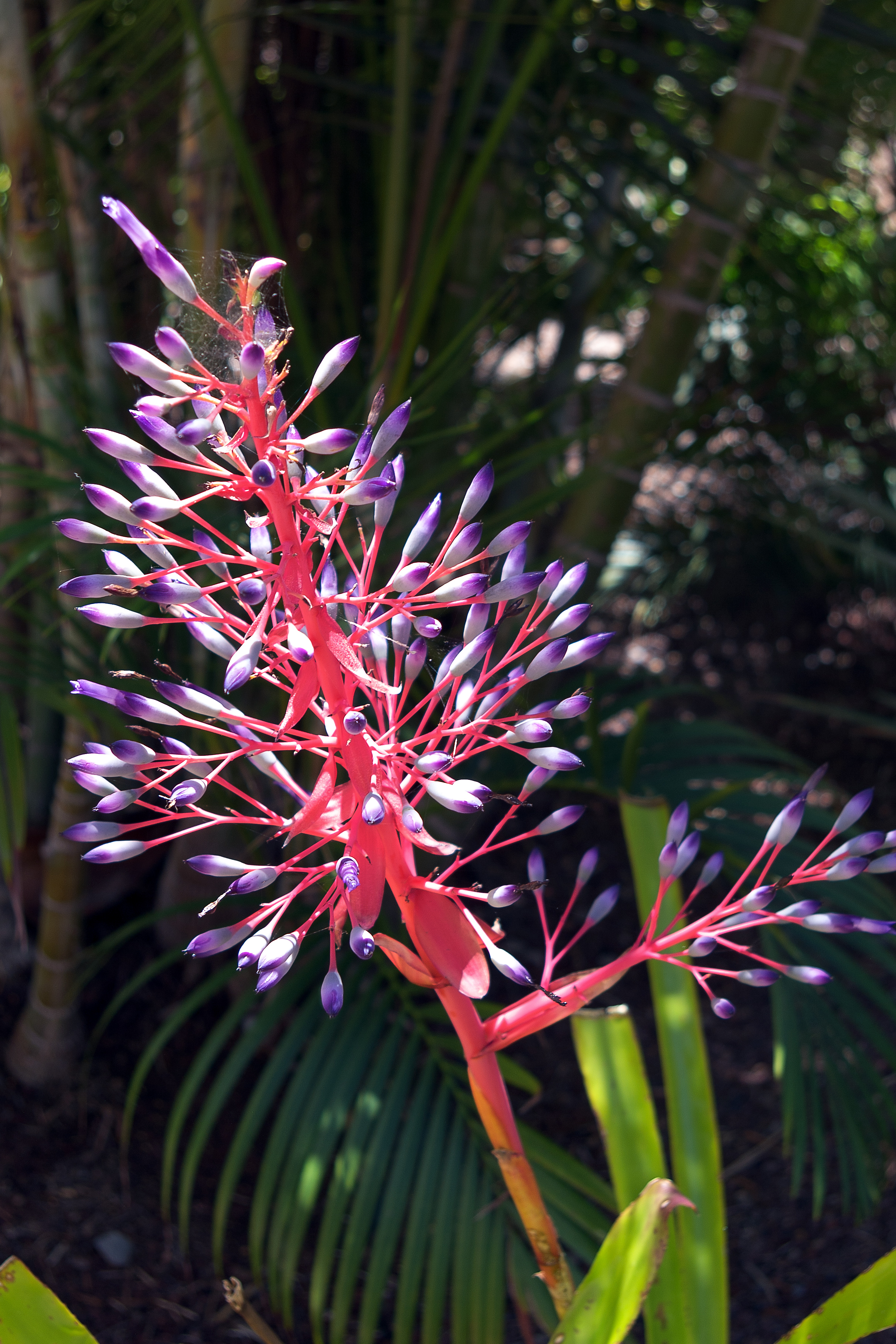

Scientific classification
- Kingdom: Plantae
- Clade: Tracheophytes
- Clade: Angiosperms
- Clade: Monocots
- Clade: Commelinids
- Order: Poales
- Family: Bromeliaceae
- Genus: Portea
- Species: P. petropolitana

Binomial name
- Portea petropolitana (Wawra) Mez

Varieties
- Portea petropolitana var. petropolitana; Portea petropolitana var. extensa; Portea petropolitana var. noettigii

= Portea petropolitana =

Species of flowering plant

Portea petropolitana is a plant species of the genus Portea, in the family Bromeliaceae.

== Distribution ==
The bromeliad is endemic to the Atlantic Forest biome (Mata Atlantica Brasileira), located in southeastern Brazil.

It is found within the states of Bahia, Espírito Santo, Minas Gerais, and Rio de Janeiro (state)

== Description ==
There are two varieties of Portea petropolitana that are cultivated as ornamental plants:

- Portea petropolitana var. petropolitana — native to Espírito Santo near the ocean. It may reach a height of 3 to 4 feet prior to flowering. The dark green leaves are heavily spined and form a stiff rosette. The inflorescence reaches 12 to 18 inches long, bearing colorful flowers with white lavender petals and orange sepals.

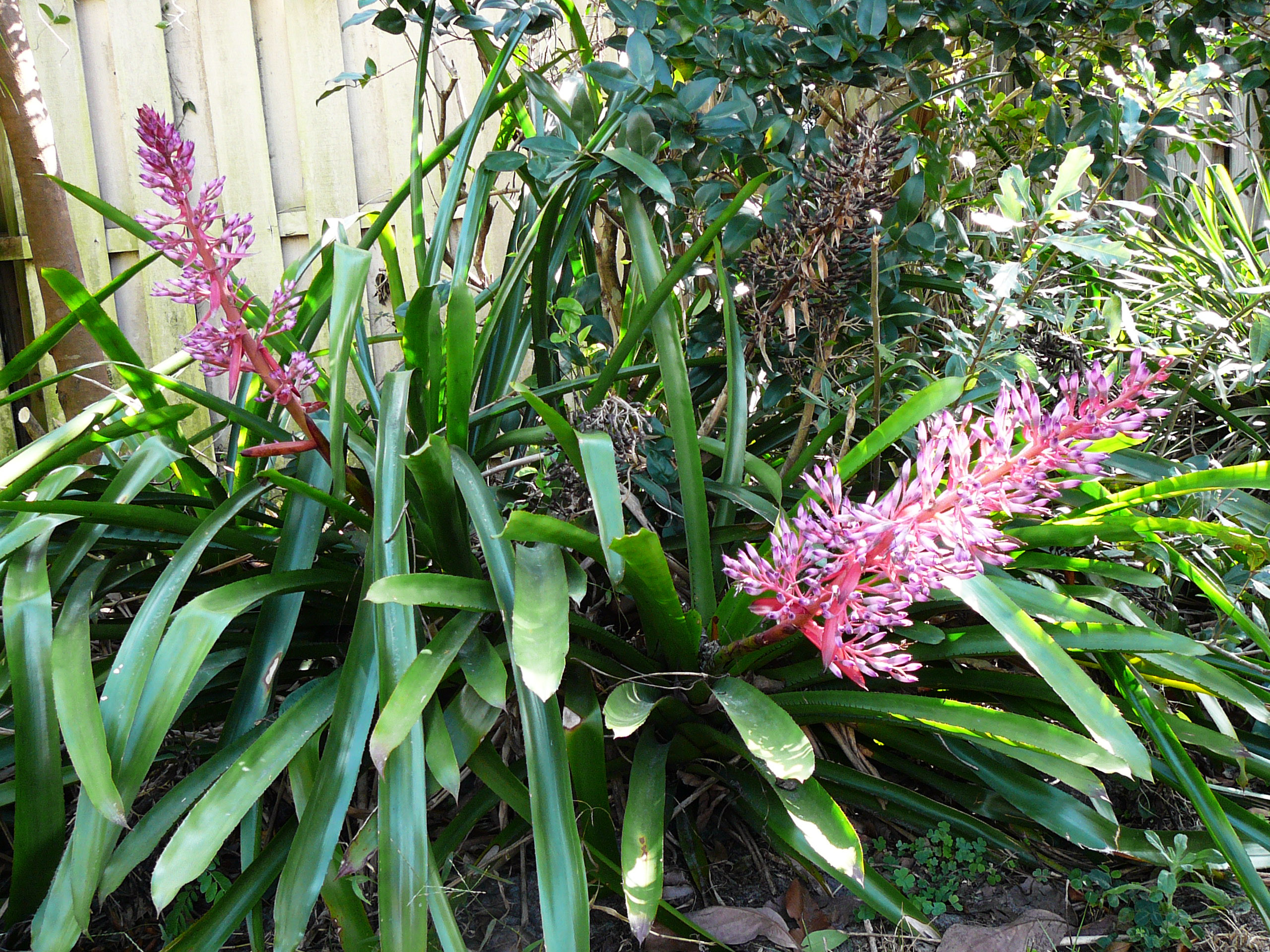
Portea Petropolitana growing in shade.

- Portea petropolitana var. extensa native to Espírito Santo. Introduced by American plant collector and breeder M. B. Foster. It is smaller in all parts compared to the other variety. It is characterized by light yellow green leaves and a coral red inflorescence with an upright rosette. The flower contains lavender petals, apple green overies, and berries that turn dark purple.
