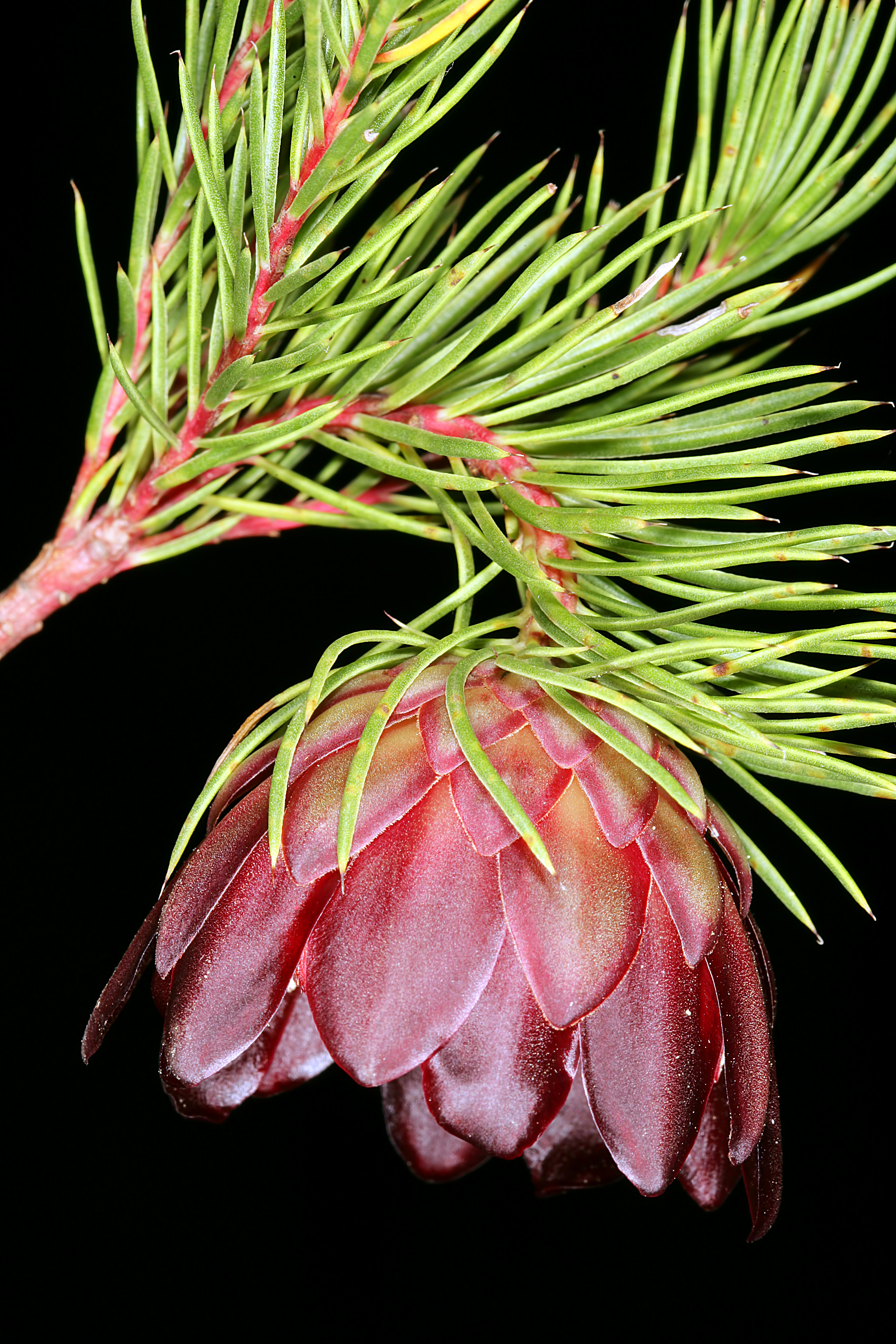
- Inflorescence of a cultivated plant photographed at Paarlberg Nature Reserve, Paarl, South Africa

Conservation status
- Least Concern (IUCN 3.1)

Scientific classification
- Kingdom: Plantae
- Clade: Embryophytes
- Clade: Tracheophytes
- Clade: Angiosperms
- Clade: Eudicots
- Order: Proteales
- Family: Proteaceae
- Genus: Protea
- Species: P. nana

Binomial name
- Protea nana (P.J.Bergius) Thunb.

Synonyms
- Leucadendron nanum P.J.Bergius; Scolymocephalus nanus Kuntze; Erodendrum acuifolium Salisb. ex. Knight; Leucadendron pinifolium DC. ex. Meisn.; Protea rosacea L.; Protea acuifolia Salisb.

= Protea nana =

Species of flowering plant

Protea nana, also known as the mountain rose or mountain-rose sugarbush, is a flowering shrub which belongs within the genus Protea.

== Common names ==
In the Afrikaans language the following vernacular names have been recorded for this plant: bergroos, warebergroos, skaamblom, skaamroos and skaamrosie. The name skaamblom translates as 'shy' or 'bashful' flower, and possibly refers to the nodding, downward-pointing inflorescences. It was first attested in the 1929 article titled Gewone Plantname in die Distrik Riversdal by Muir in Die Huisgenoot.

== Taxonomy ==
The species was first described according to the modern Linnaean system as Leucadendron nanum by Peter Jonas Bergius in 1766. Five years later Linnaeus described the same species as Protea rosacea, a heterotypic synonym. It had already been described before these two authors as Thymelæa æthiopica abietiforriiis floribus phœniceis in a 1700 work by Leonard Plukenet. In 1781 Carl Peter Thunberg moved the taxon to the genus Protea. It was originally described as occurring in the mountains of the Roode Zant region, an area which is now known as Witzenberg.

=== Etymology ===
The specific epithet nana is derived from the Latin word for 'dwarf', and this was chosen in reference to the relatively small inflorescences.

== Description ==
Protea nana grows as a small shrub which is shaped roundish in profile, is highly branched, and becomes 1.3 m (4 ft 3 in) high. In cultivation plants live up to approximately ten years. The branches curve gracefully outward when laden by blooms. They are coloured green when young and in their first season, but turn red in the following season, eventually turning brown when mature.

The leaves are glabrous, coloured deep green, soft and needle-shaped. These needles all curve upwards, and are about 18–30 mm long, and 1.0–1.5 mm wide.

It blooms in midwinter to early summer, primarily from July to October, but more broadly from June to November. The plant is monoecious with both sexes in each flower. The inflorescences are subtended by oval-shaped, bright red to crimson bracts, within which numerous, much shorter, crimson-coloured flowers reside. The colour may also vary from burgundy, or a dirty, faded red to pale green. These inflorescences are cup-shaped, pendulous (pointed downward), and nod in the wind. The flowers have a characteristic yeasty odour.

The fruits ripen after some seven months. The fruits are woody and persistent, which means they are retained on the plant after senescence. The seed is kept within the dry fruit for several years, and when finally released after the plant burns and dies. This is known as fire-mediated serotiny. The seeds are spread to new growing sites by means of the wind. These seeds are small and light, and covered with a pappus of fine hairs. The temperatures dropping at night appears to stimulate germination.

It has proteoid, cluster roots which form a mat only a few centimetres thick, which is found just below the surface of the soil.

== Distribution ==
The plant is endemic to the Western Cape province of South Africa, and is found from the Groot Winterhoek mountains, through the Du Toits Mountains, to the Skurweberg near Ceres. It occurs near the towns of Porterville, Ceres, Paarl, Tulbagh and Worcester. It is usually found occurring in a large number isolated stands.

== Ecology ==
The plant grows on mountain slopes at altitudes of 400 to 900 metres (1,300 to 3,000 ft). It prefers a fynbos habitat, and is found growing on granite-based or sandstone-based substrates. It grows on both dry sand or moist, peaty loam. It prefers a slightly acidic soil as substrate. The fynbos soils where it grows are very phosphorus-deficient.

Potential wildfires destroy the plant, but the seeds are able to survive such an event. The leaves have evolved to be long and narrow to conserve water and survive the hot and dry summers of the fynbos.

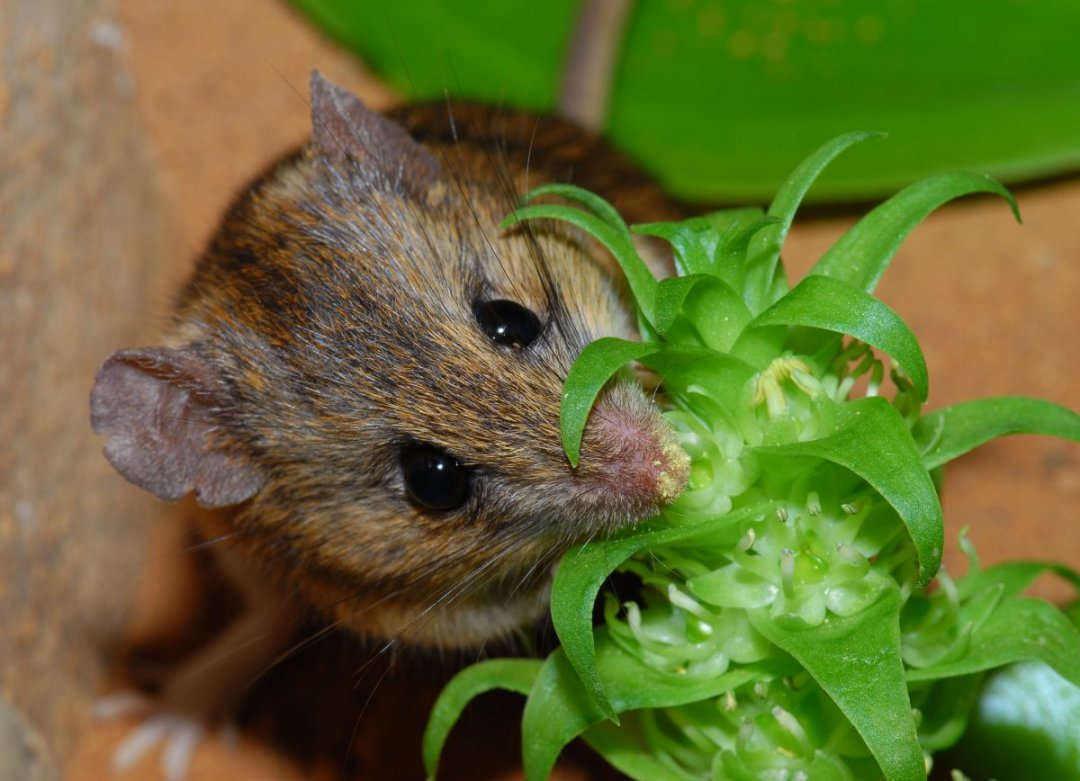
A potential pollinator of Protea nana, the Namaqua rock mouse, feeding on nectar of Whiteheadia bifolia

In 1998 it was still unknown what creature(s) might be responsible for the pollination, and the flowers produce very little nectar compared to other Protea. The nectar is, however, fortified with a high sugar content; the sugars include xylose. The downward-pointing shape, the odd yeasty odour, high sugar content and the flowering time in late winter all indicate pollination by rodents. Animals which have now been recorded as visiting the flowers are, besides sunbirds, the rodent species Otomys irroratus, Micaelamys namaquensis, Rhabdomys pumilio and Myomyscus verreauxii. Each of these rodents were found with this plants pollen on their noses or in their scat. M. verreauxi is the best at climbing and is thought to be the main pollinator. Rhabdomys pumilio, on the other hand, was sometimes found to be quite destructive of the inflorescences in a laboratory setting. In the field on average 20% of the inflorescences are destroyed within a two-month period, and this mouse is thought to be likely responsible. The xylose in the nectar can be metabolised by the intestinal microbiotic flora of the small mouse Micaelamys namaquensis. Otomys irroratus does not appear to pollinate the flowers. Despite the rodent pollination, when researchers placed the plants in wire mesh cages to exclude rodents and birds but allow access to insects, the plants were still able to set seed in appreciable amounts, something which was not the case when insects were excluded as well, indicating rodents are usually only partially responsible for pollinating this species.

== Uses ==
It keeps well as a cut flower.

=== Horticulture ===
Although Protea nana is a fast-growing and handsome species, it is a short-lived and difficult plant to cultivate under ordinary garden conditions. It is best grown in tall containers, on slopes, raised embankments, or in rock gardens to better enjoy the nodding flower heads. In cultivation it is best grown in heavy, low nutrient, but well-drained soils. It is best propagated by seed, but top cuttings can root when applied with growth hormones and kept for a few months in a well-drained substrate with ground heating. Seeds sprout best in a well-drained, coarse, sandy, acidic, sterile soil. Seeds start to germinate after some six weeks. Young plants are best grown out in a shade house. The plants can be lightly pruned to encourage branching and produce more flowers. The plants are sensitive to high levels of phosphates in normal fertilizer. Root fungi such as Phytophthora or Armillaria can be deadly.

== Conservation ==
The population of this species is believed to be stable, and the South African National Biodiversity Institute has assessed the conservation status of the species as 'least concern' since 2009. It grows fairly abundantly in protected areas.

== Gallery ==
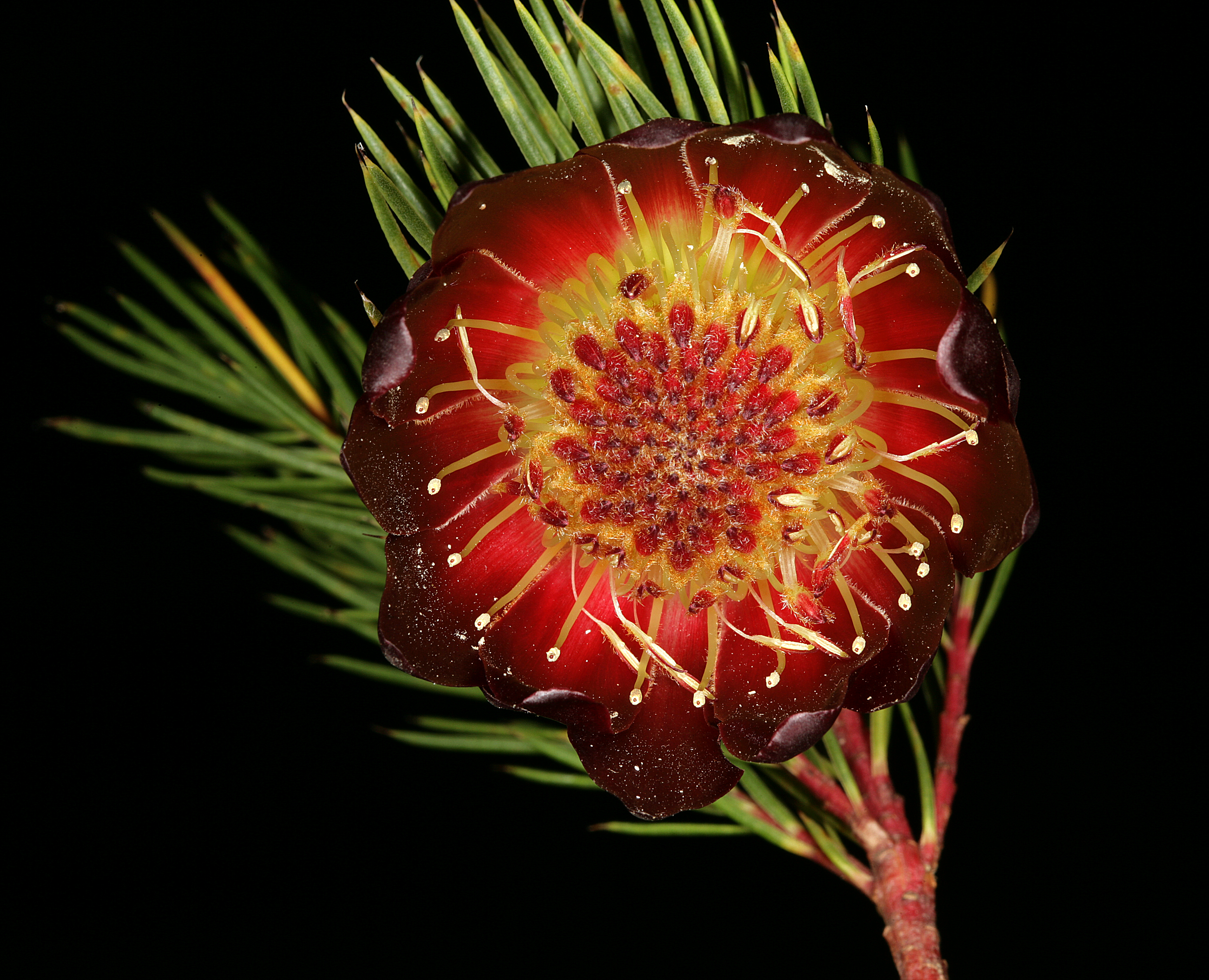
Protea nana, anthesis of inflorescence.

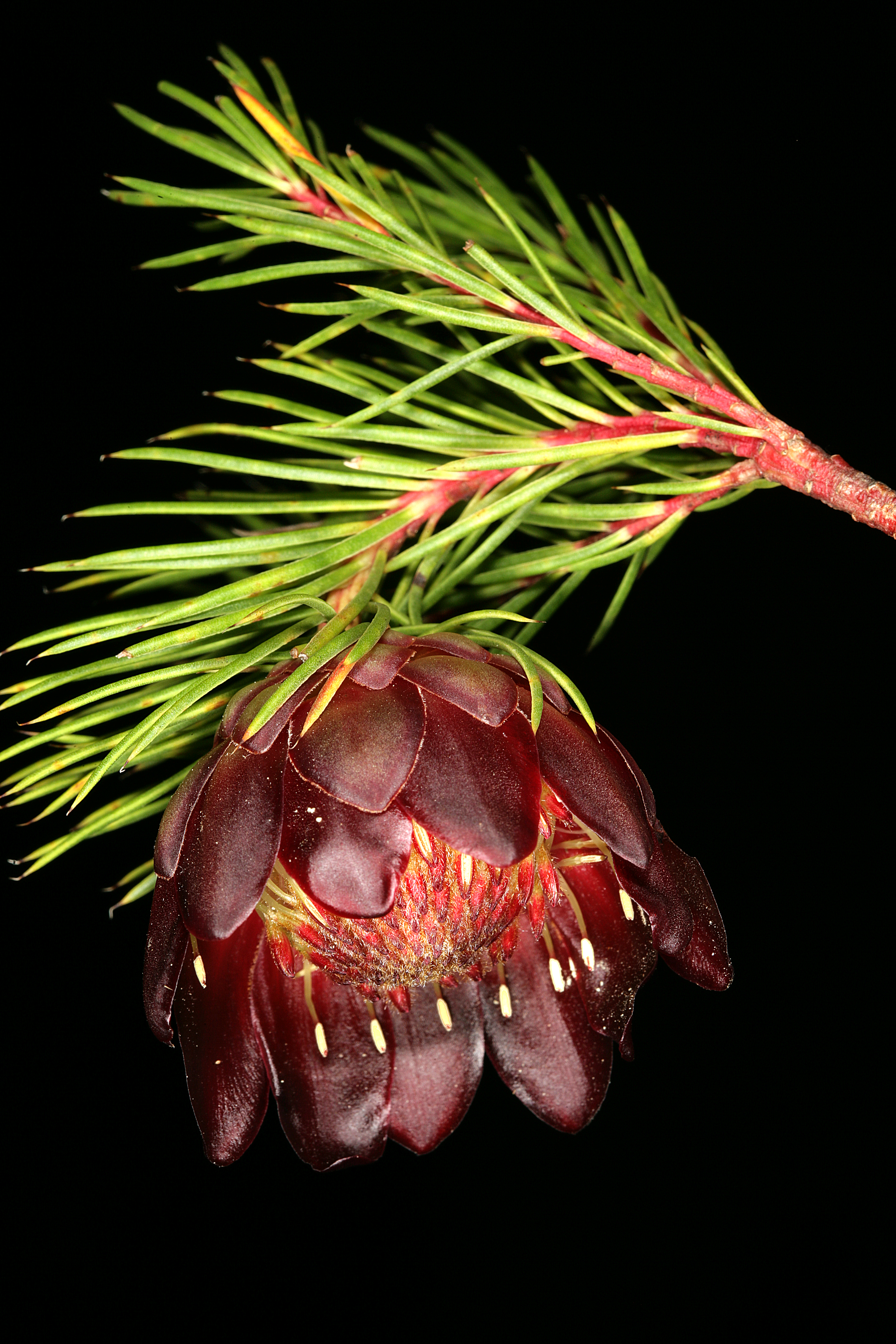
Protea nana cultivated at Paarlberg Nature Reserve, Paarl, Western Cape, South Africa

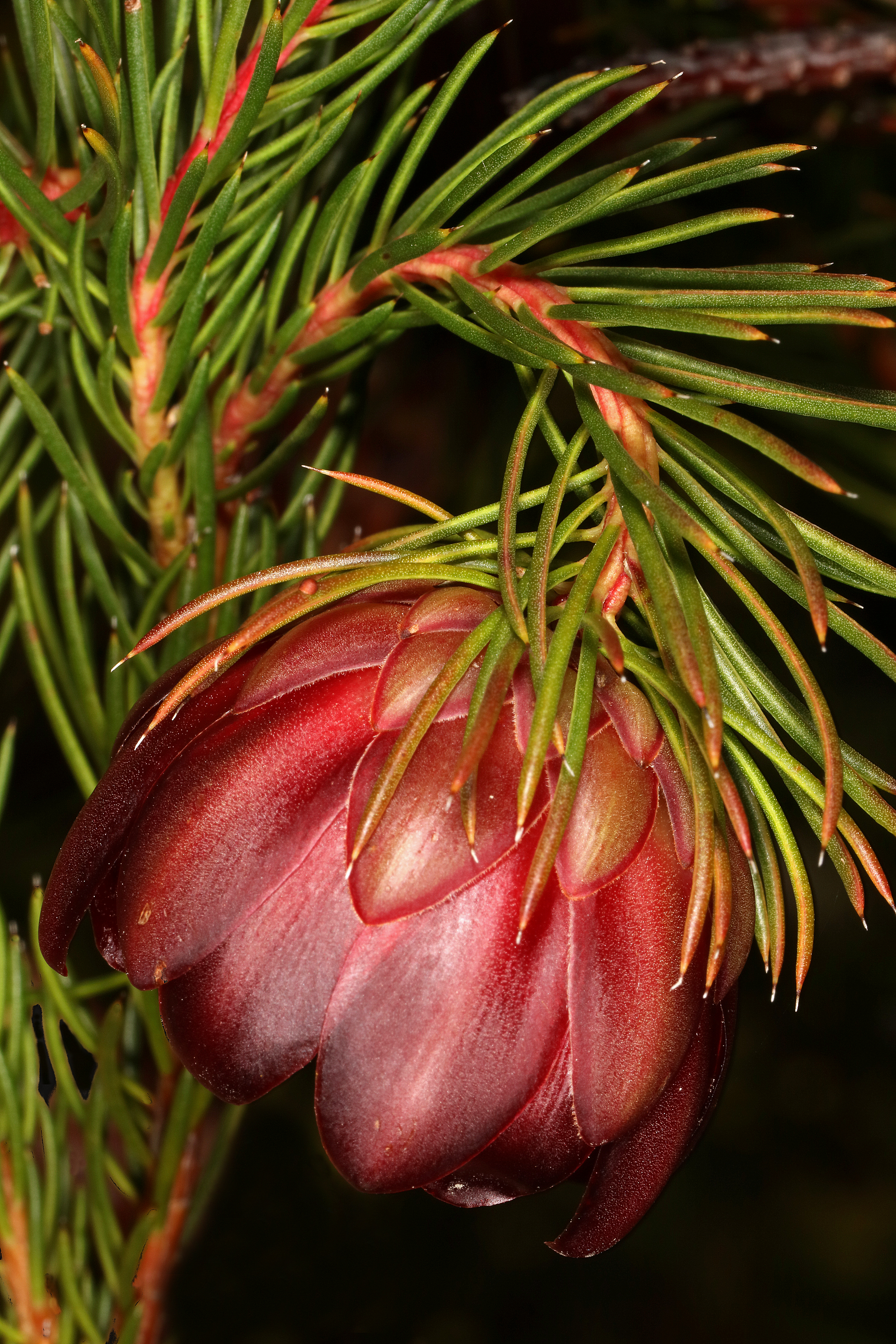
Protea nana cultivated at Betty's Bay, Western Cape, South Africa

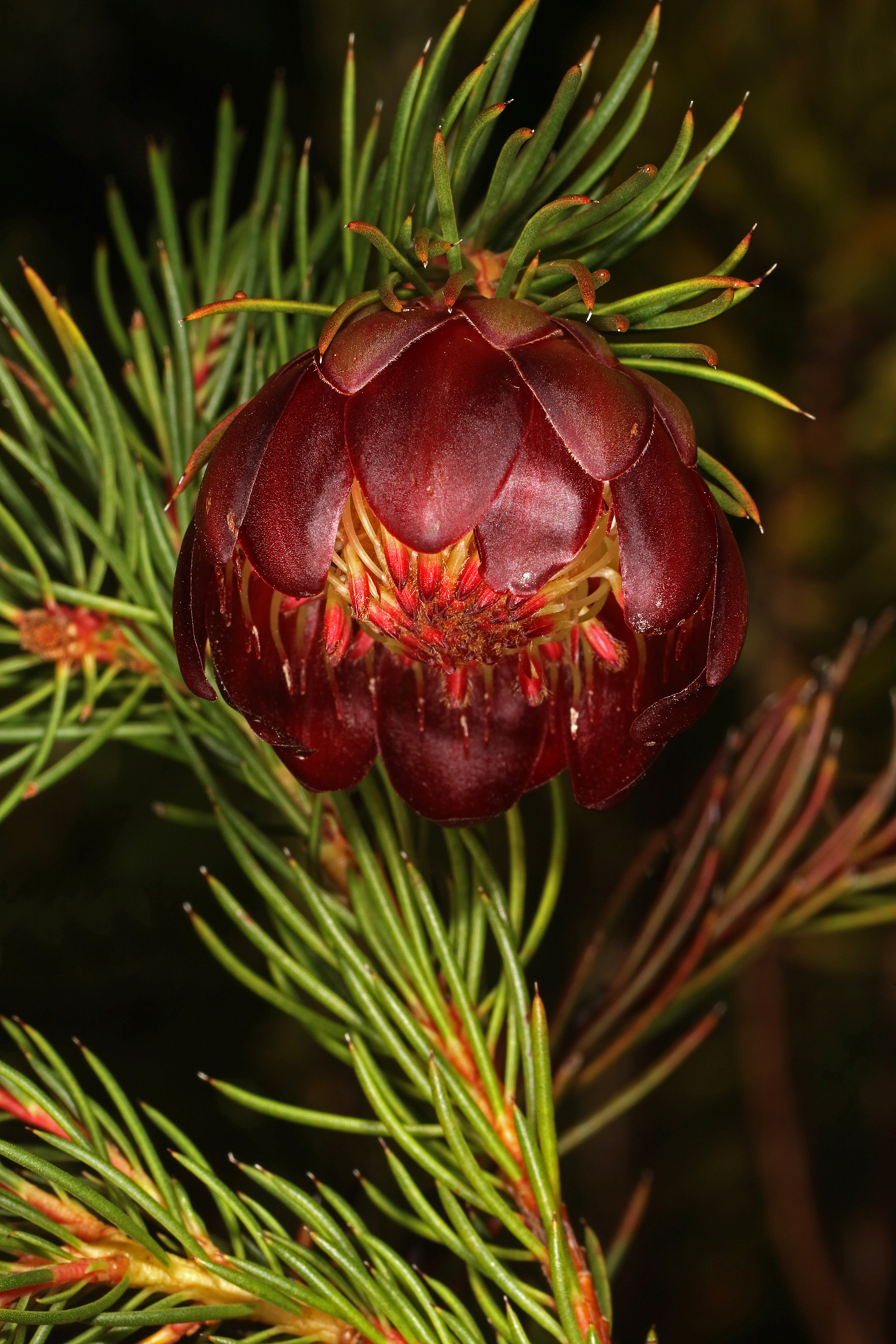
Protea nana cultivated at Betty's Bay, Western Cape, South Africa
